= Walker Art Gallery =

Art gallery in Liverpool, England

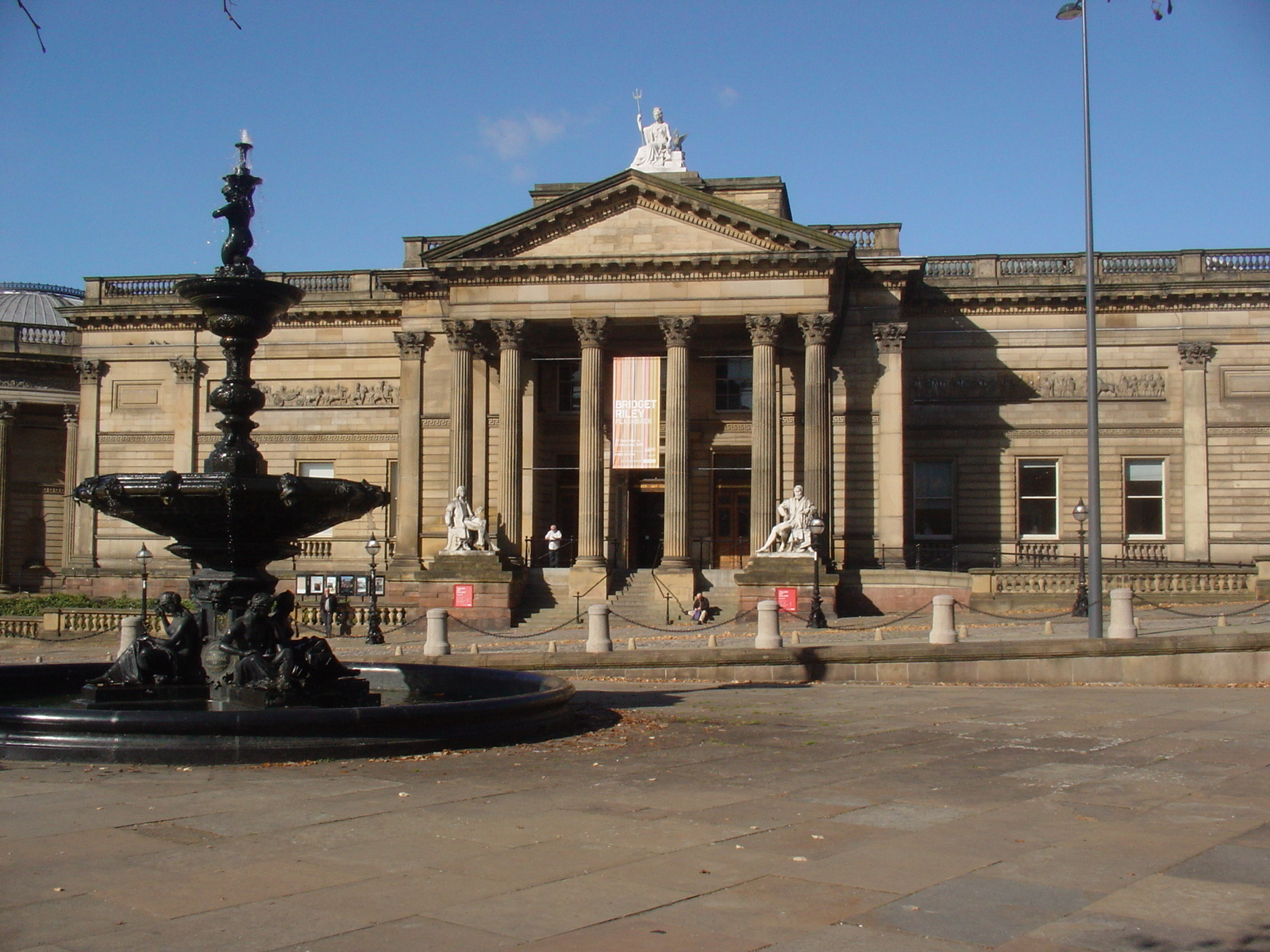
- Walker Art Gallery

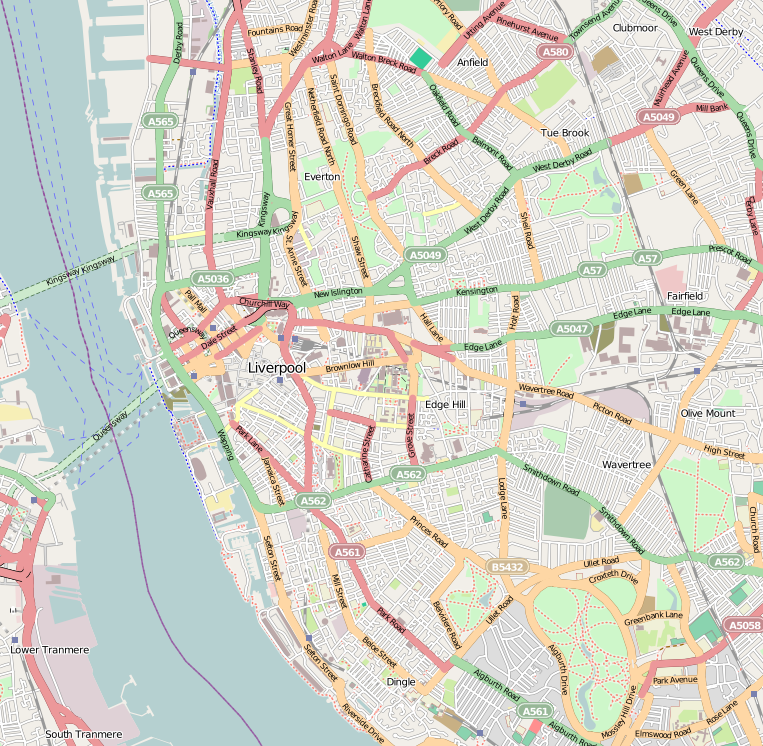
- Location within Liverpool
- Established: 1877
- Location: William Brown Street, Liverpool, England
- Coordinates: 53°24′36″N 02°58′47″W
- Visitors: 258,222 (2025)
- Founder: Sir Andrew Barclay Walker
- Architects: Cornelius Sherlock & H. H. Vale
- Public transit access: Liverpool Lime Street
- Website: www.liverpoolmuseums.org.uk/walker/

Listed Building – Grade II*
- Official name: Walker Art Gallery
- Designated: 28 June 1952
- Reference no.: 1063782

The Walker Art Gallery is a Grade II* listed art gallery in Liverpool which houses one of the largest art collections in England outside London. It is part of the National Museums Liverpool group.

== History ==
The Walker Art Gallery's collection dates from 1819 when the Liverpool Royal Institution acquired 37 paintings from the collection of William Roscoe, who had to sell his collection following the failure of his banking business, though it was saved from being broken up by his friends and associates.

In 1843 the Royal Institution's collection was displayed in a purpose-built gallery next to the institution's main premises. In 1850 negotiations by an association of citizens to take over the institution's collection, for display in a proposed art gallery, library and museum, came to nothing.

The collection grew over the following decades: in 1851 Liverpool Town Council bought Liverpool Academy's diploma collection and further works were acquired from the Liverpool Society for the Fine Arts, founded in 1858. The competition between the academy and society eventually led to both collapsing.

William Brown Library and Museum opened in 1860, named after a Liverpool merchant whose generosity enabled the Town Council to act upon an 1852 Act of Parliament which allowed the establishment of a public library, museum and art gallery, and in 1871 the council organised the first Liverpool Autumn Exhibition, held at the new library and museum.

The success of the exhibition enabled the Library, Museum and Arts Committee to purchase works for the council's permanent collection, buying around 150 works between 1871 and 1910. Works acquired included WF Yeames' And when did you last see your father? and Dante Gabriel Rossetti's Dante's Dream.

Designed by local architects Cornelius Sherlock and H. H. Vale, the Walker Art Gallery was opened on 6 September 1877 by Edward Henry Stanley, 15th Earl of Derby. It is named after its founding benefactor, Sir Andrew Barclay Walker (1824–1893), a former mayor of Liverpool and wealthy brewer born in Ayrshire who expanded the family business to England and moved to live in Gateacre.

In 1893 the Liverpool Royal Institution placed its collection on long-term loan to the gallery and in 1948 presented William Roscoe's collection and other works. This occurred during post-war reconstruction when the gallery was closed, re-opening in 1951. During the Second World War the gallery was taken over by the Ministry of Food and the collection was dispersed for safety.

Extensions to the gallery were opened in 1884 and 1933 (following a two-year closure) when the gallery re-opened with an exhibition including Picasso and Gauguin. In 2002 the gallery re-opened following a major refurbishment.

In 1986 the gallery achieved national status, as part of the National Museums and Galleries on Merseyside.

The gallery is housed in a neo-Classical building located on William Brown Street. The neighbouring area includes the William Brown Library, World Museum Liverpool, St George's Hall, Wellington's Column, Lime Street Station and the entrance to the Queensway Tunnel. The other major art gallery in Liverpool is Tate Liverpool, at the Albert Dock, which houses modern art.

Gallery Rooms

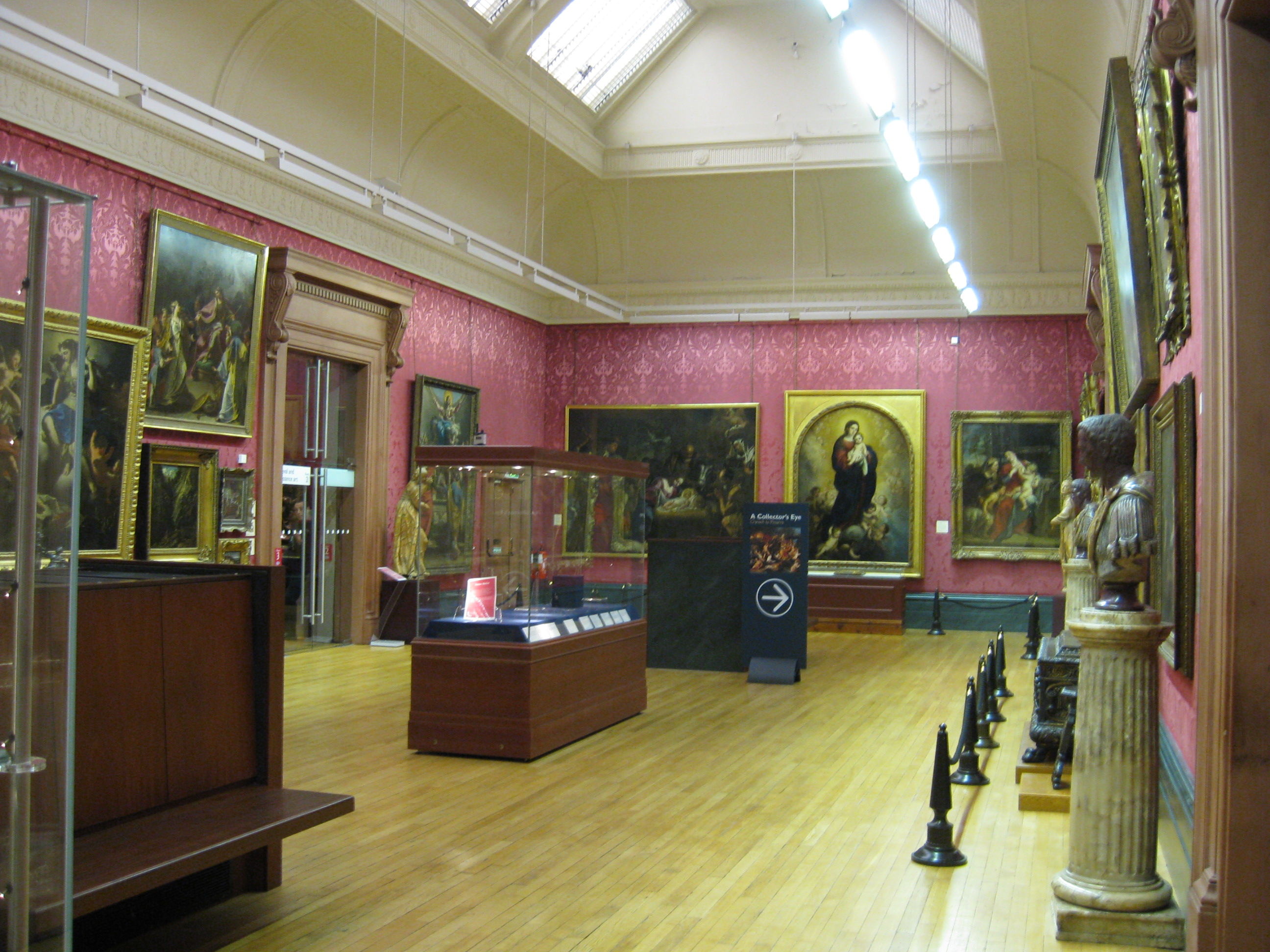
Late Renaissance Gallery

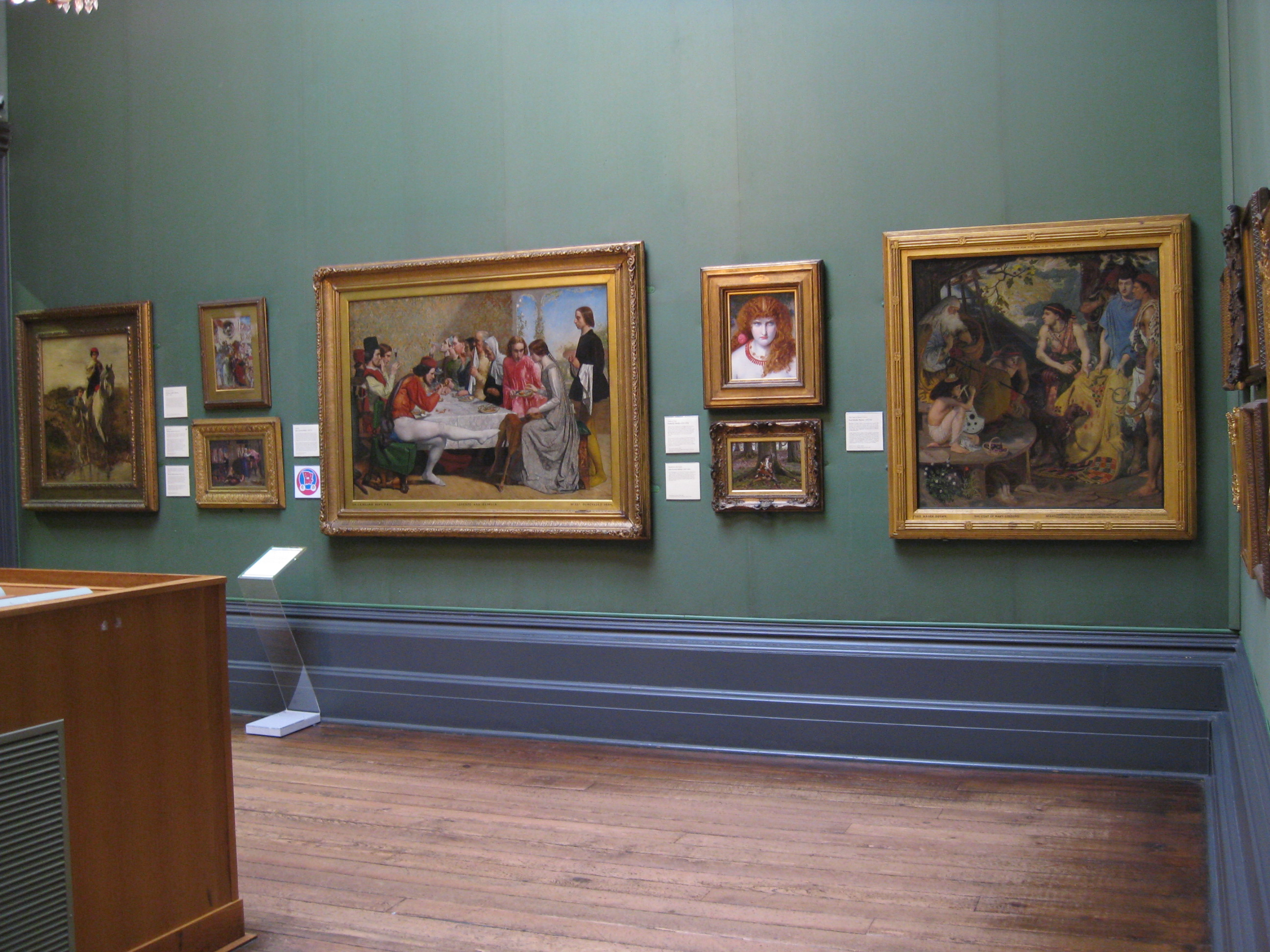
Pre-Raphaelite Gallery

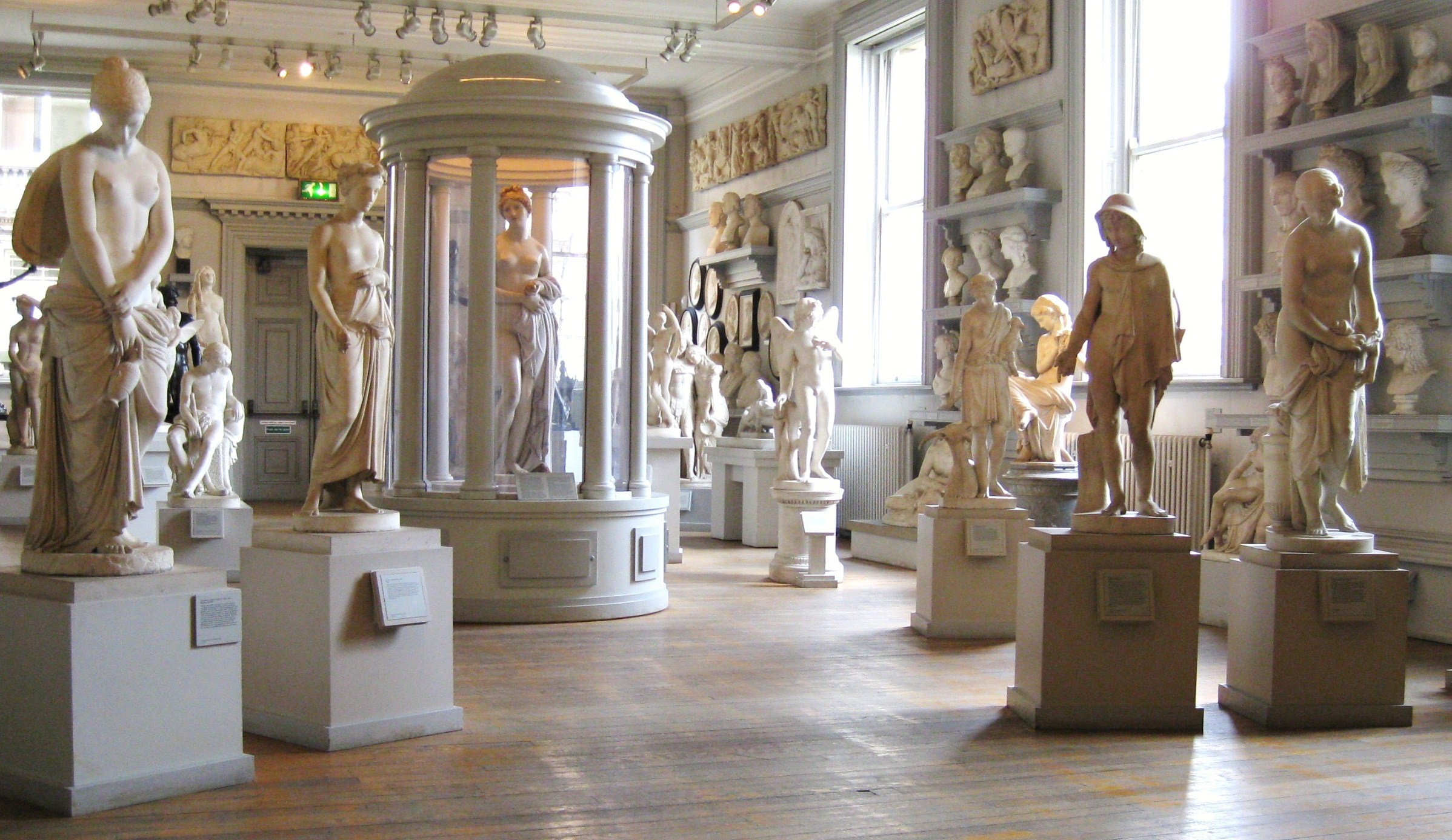
Sculpture Gallery

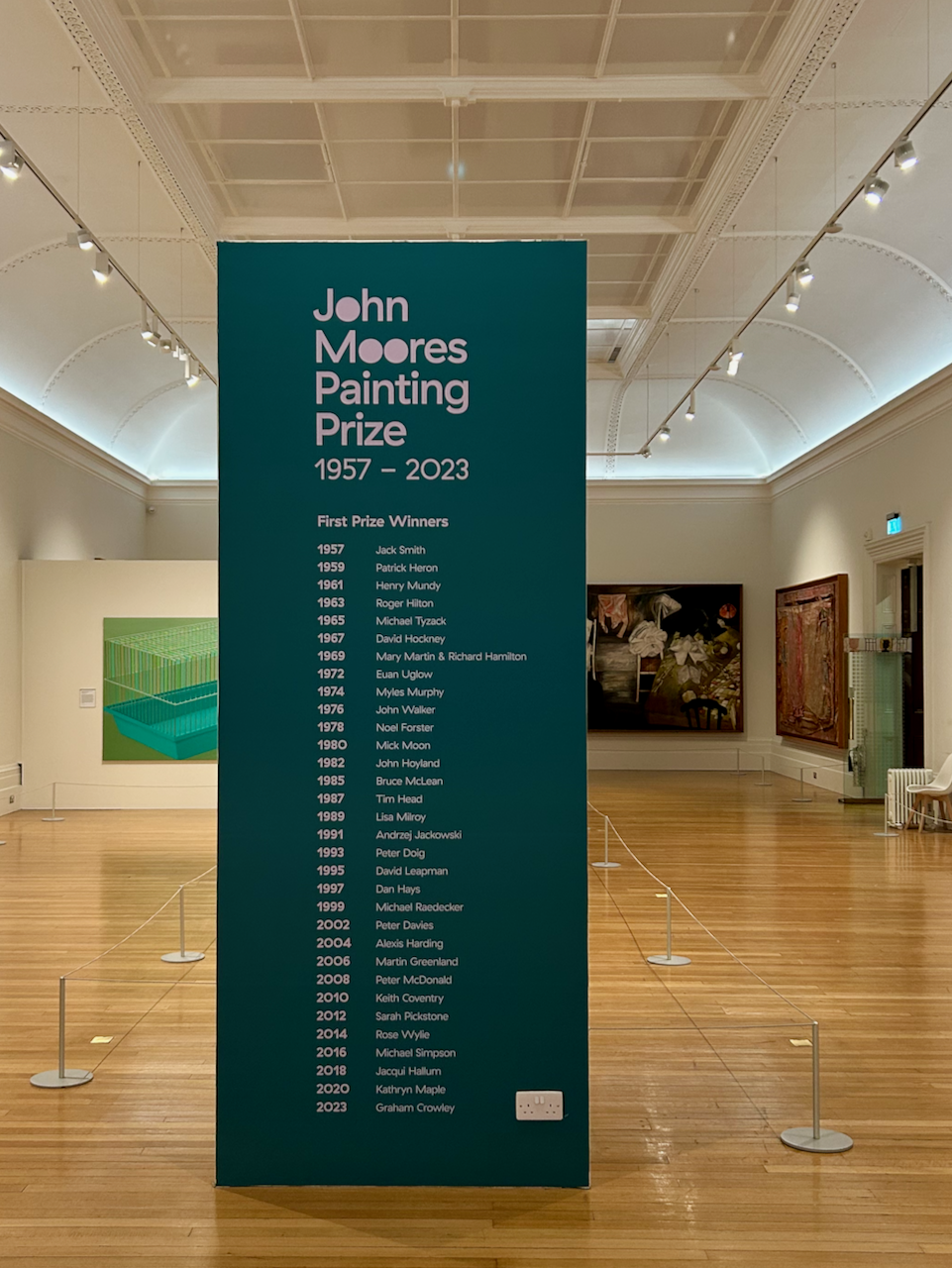
Modern & Contemporary gallery

== Permanent collection ==
The Walker's collection includes Italian and Netherlandish paintings from 1300 to 1550, European art from 1550 to 1900, including works by Giambattista Pittoni, Rembrandt, Poussin and Degas, 18th and 19th-century British art, including a major collection of Victorian painting and many Pre-Raphaelite works, a wide collection of prints, drawings and watercolours, 20th-century works by artists such as Lucian Freud, David Hockney and Gilbert and George and a major sculpture collection. The select collection of minor or decorative arts covers a wide range, from Gothic ivories to British ceramics up to the present day. The gallery also houses the only original Stuart Sutcliffe painting on permanent display in Liverpool.

On 17 December 2011, the Walker Art Gallery got a new addition to its collection – a statue of a priest vandalised by Banksy. The renowned graffiti artist had sawn off the face of an 18th-century replica stone bust and glued on a selection of bathroom tiles. The resulting 'pixellated' portrait is entitled Cardinal Sin and is believed to be a comment on the abuse scandal in the Church and its subsequent cover-up. This piece of art is displayed in Room three, which is one of the 17th-century Old Master galleries.

As of 2 July 2013, the La Masseuse sculpture by Edgar Degas, previously owned by Lucian Freud, found a permanent home at the Walker Art Gallery, due to the donation-in-payment system put in place by Arts Council England.

== Gallery ==
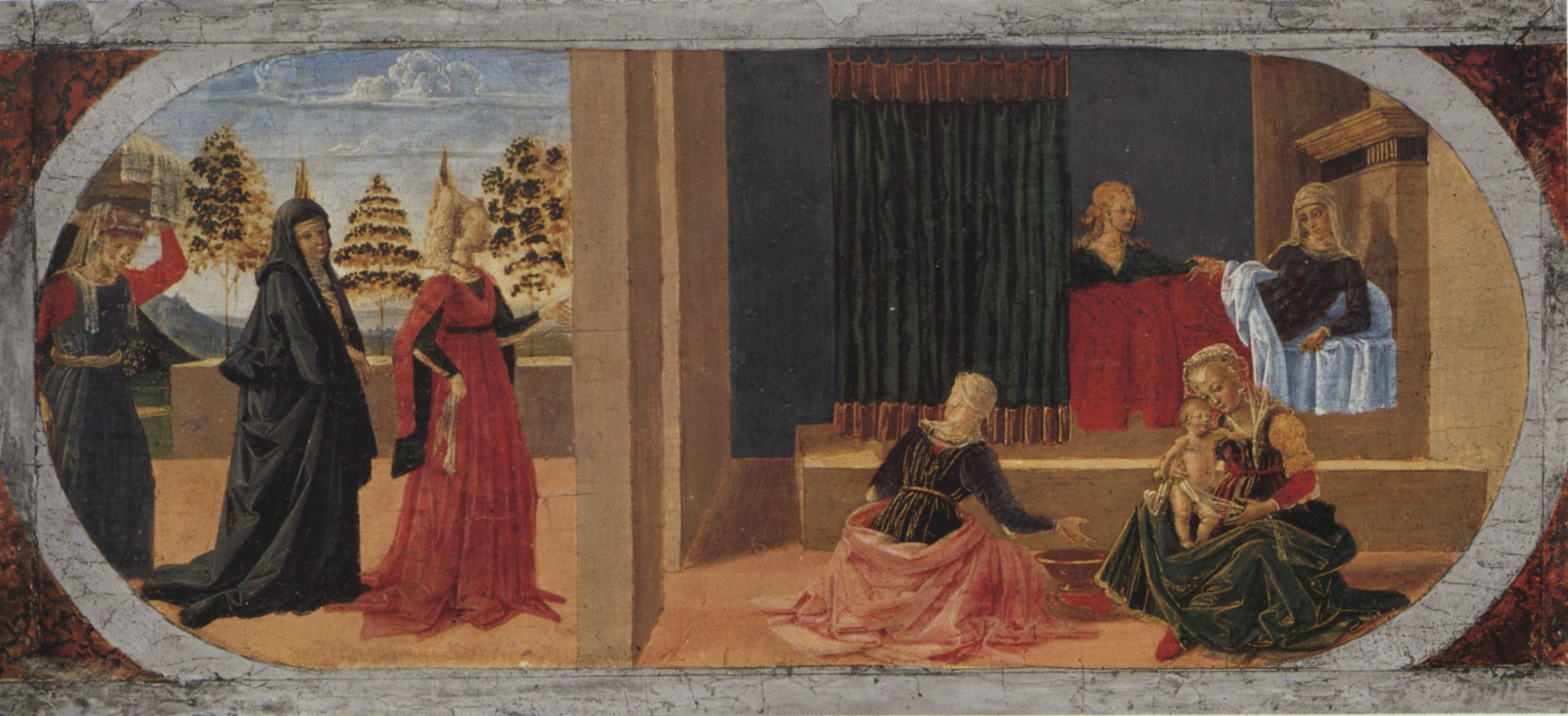
Pietro Perugino
Nativity of the Virgin
c. 1472

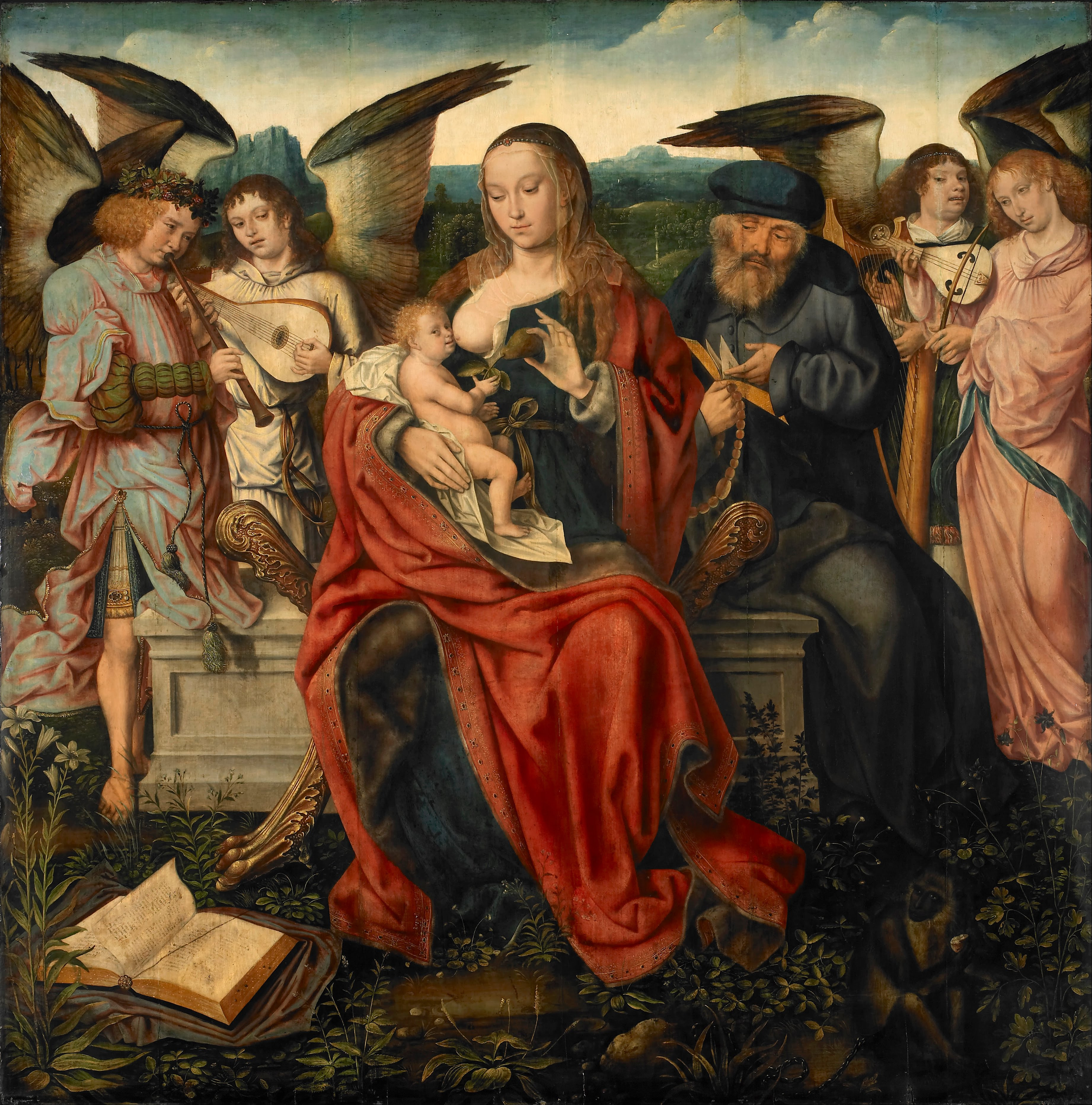
Holy Family with Music Making Angels
c. 1510–1520

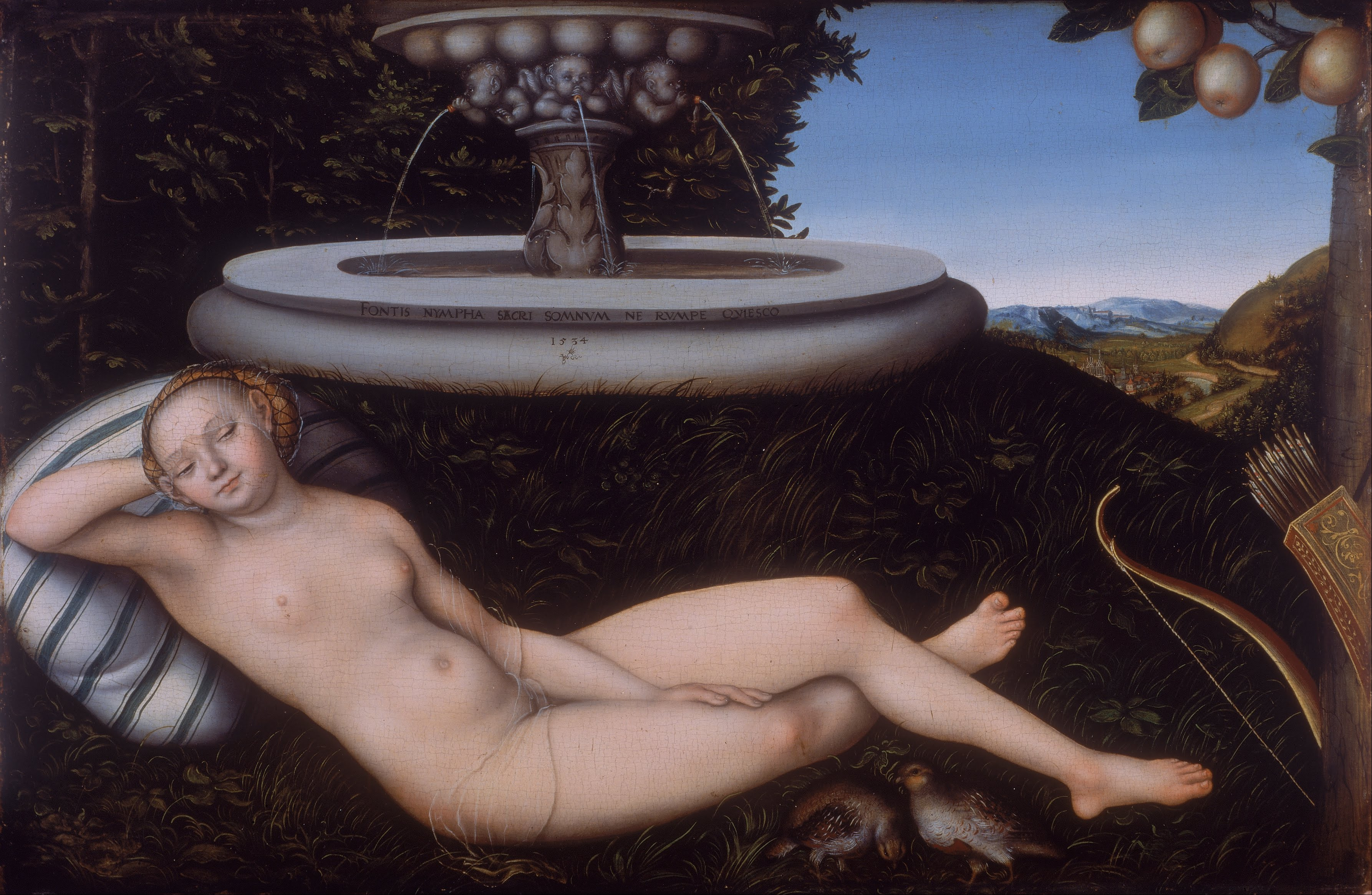
Lucas Cranach the Elder
The Nymph of the Fountain
1534

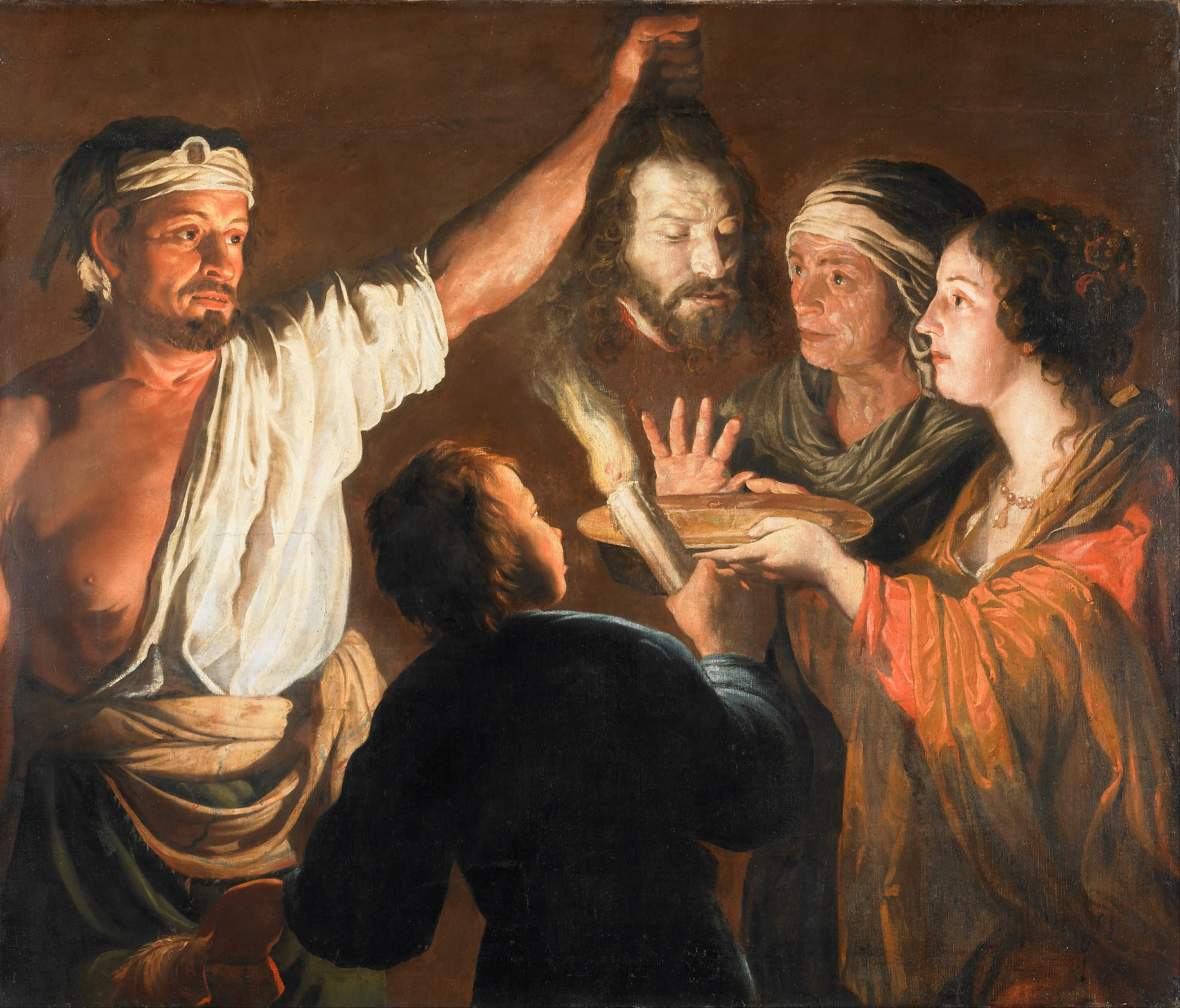
William Dobson
The Executioner with the Head of John the Baptist
c. 1640

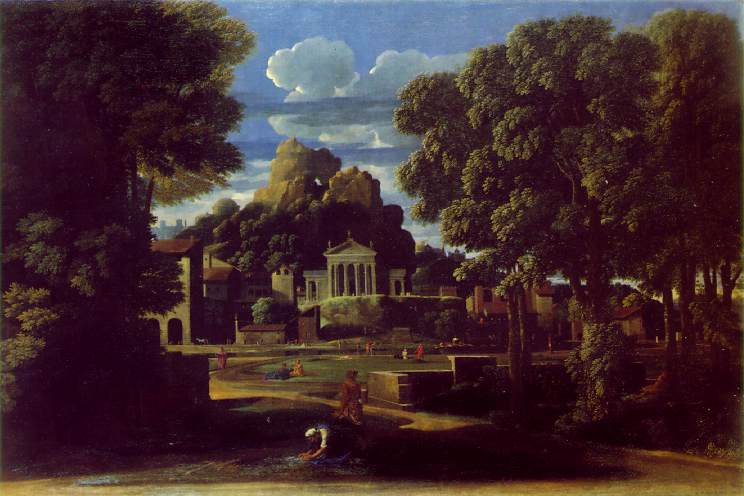
Nicolas Poussin
Landscape with the Ashes of Phocion
1648

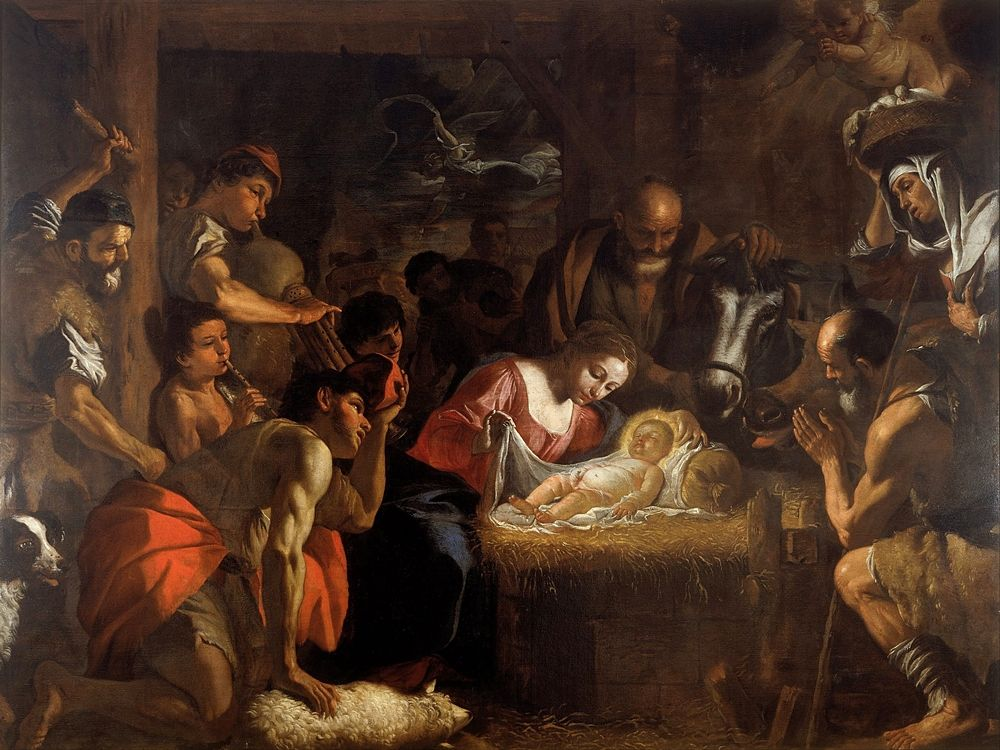
Mattia Preti
Adoration of the Shepherds
c. 1675–1680

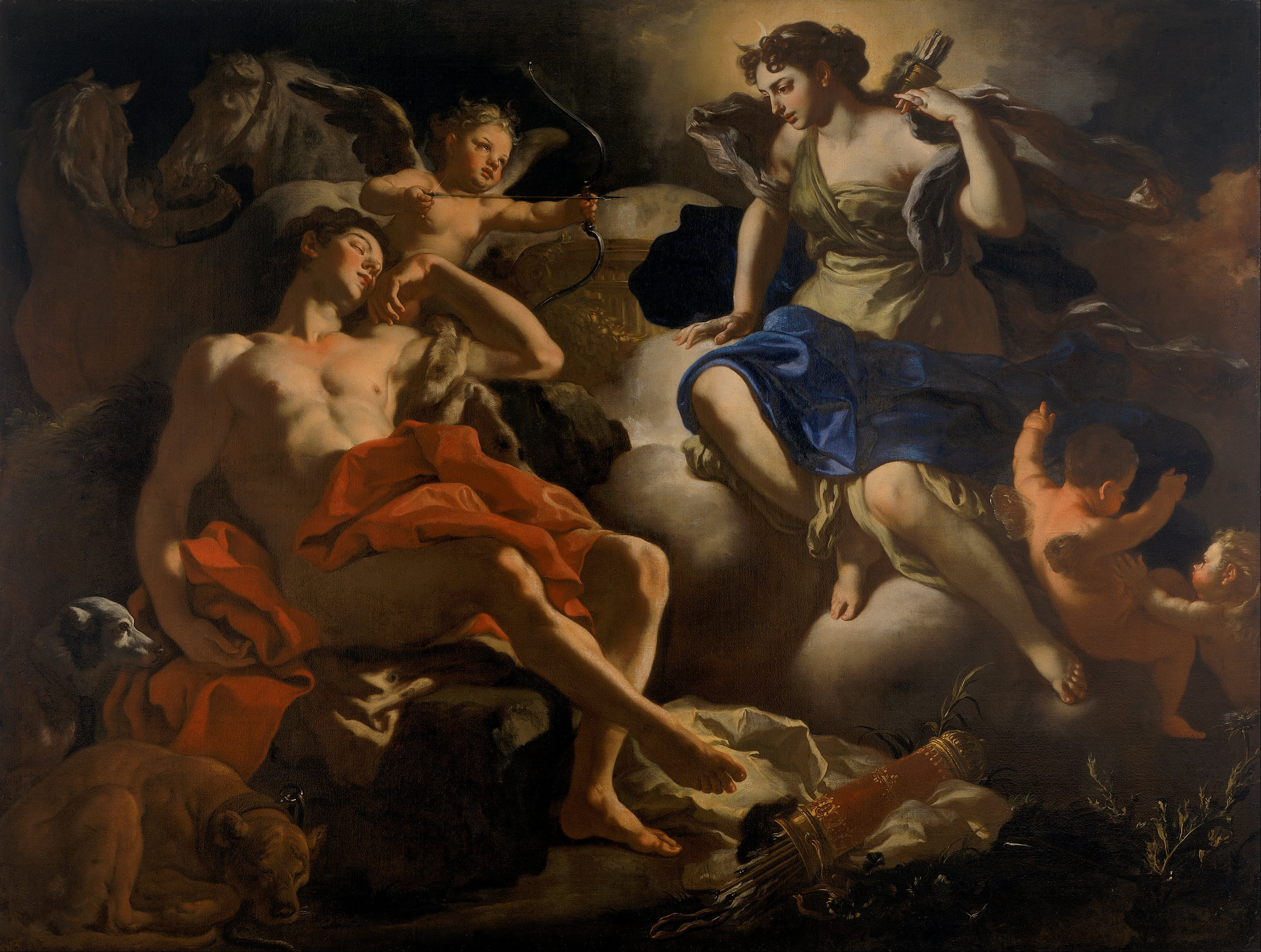
Francesco Solimena
Diana and Endymion
c. 1705–1710

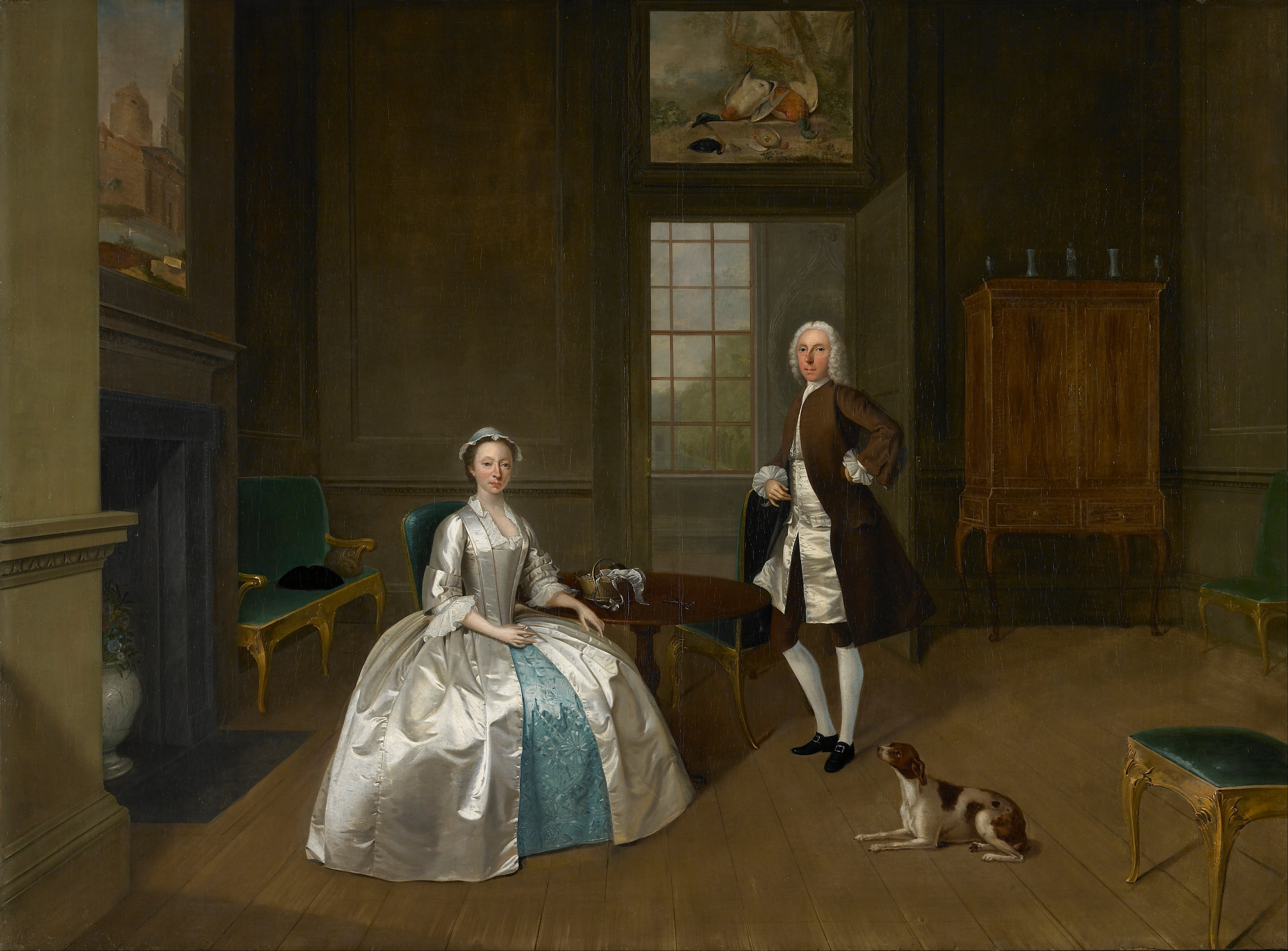
Arthur Devis
Mr and Mrs Atherton
c. 1743

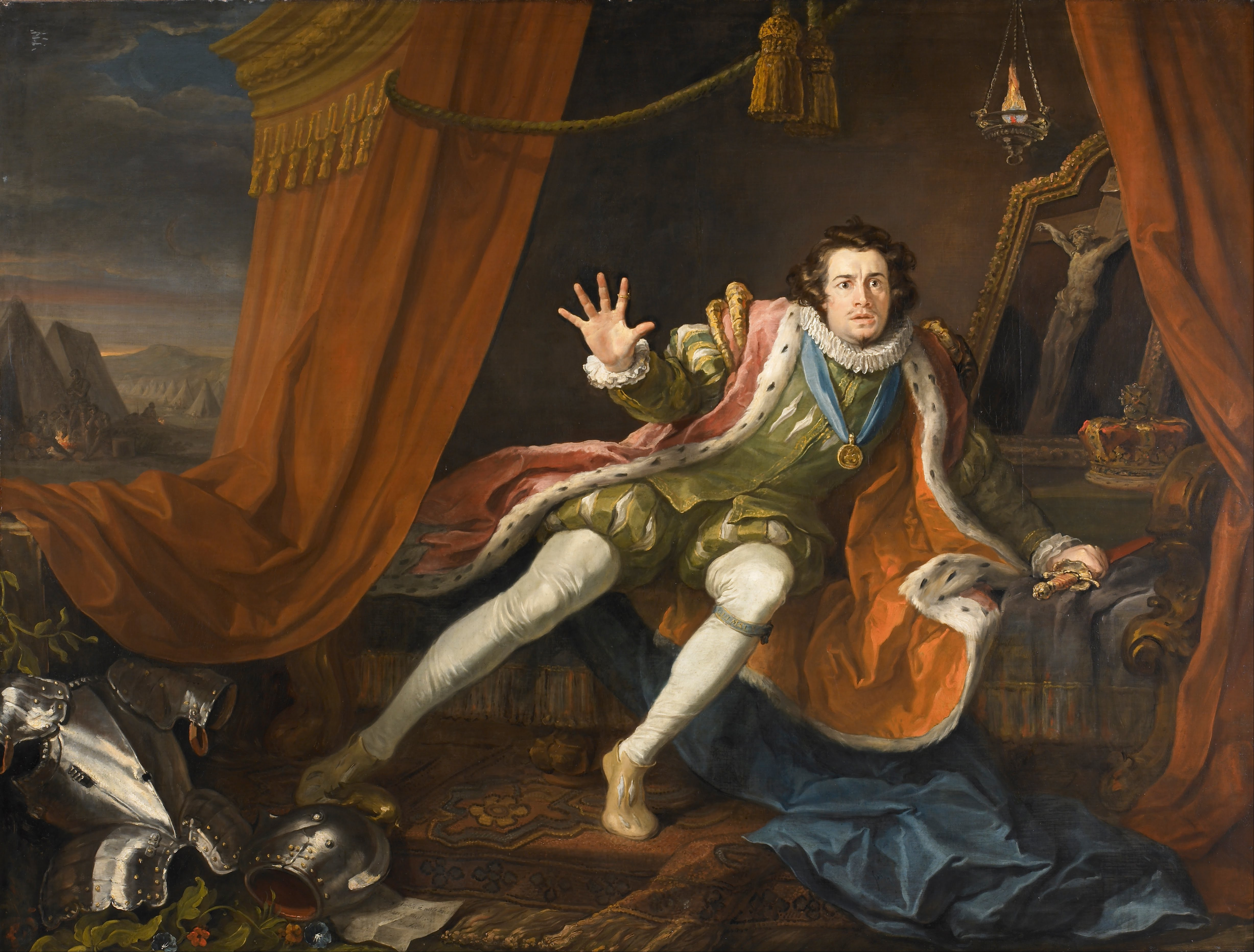
William Hogarth
David Garrick as Richard III
c. 1745

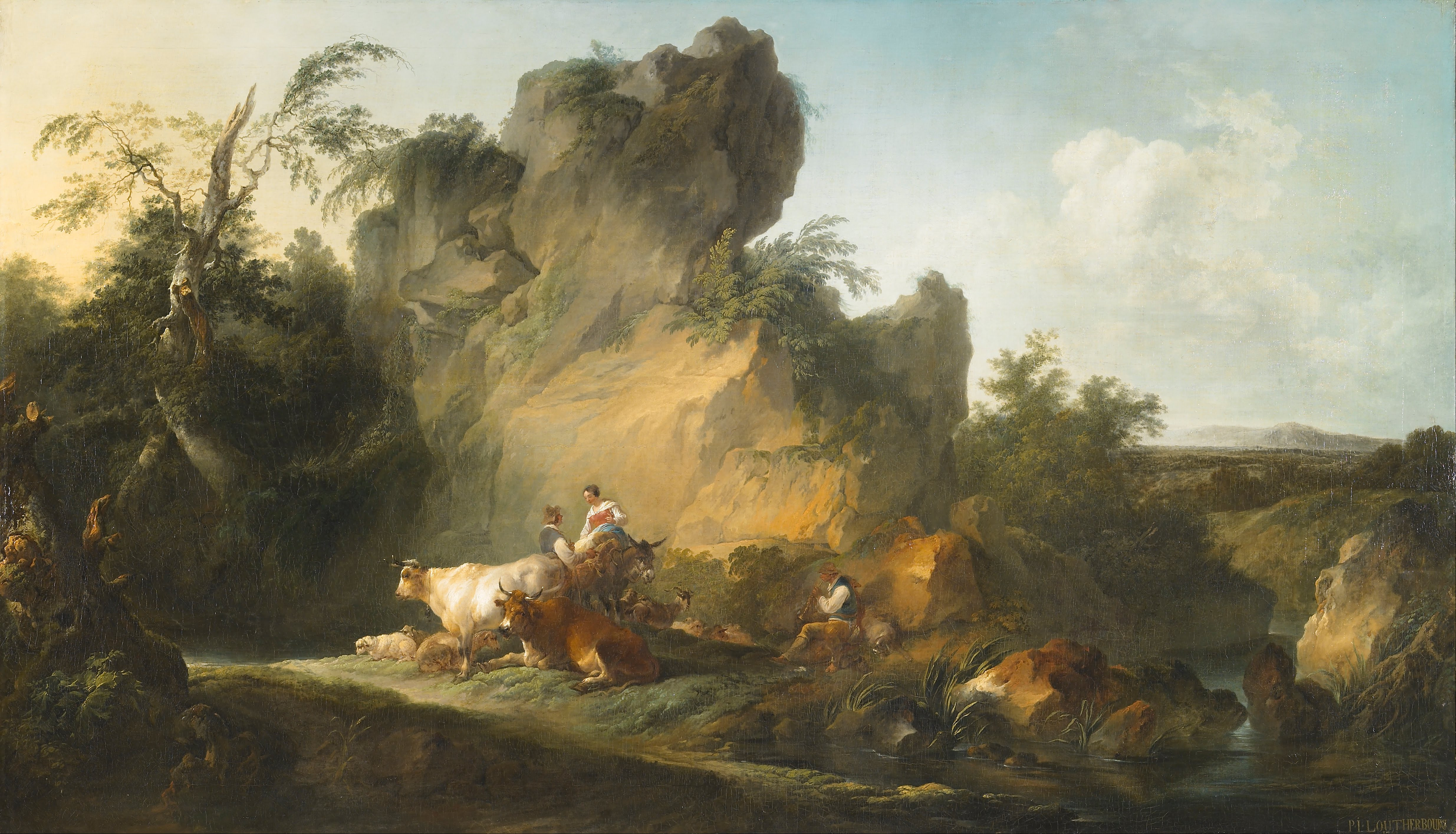
Philip James de Loutherbourg
Landscape with Figures and Animals
1763

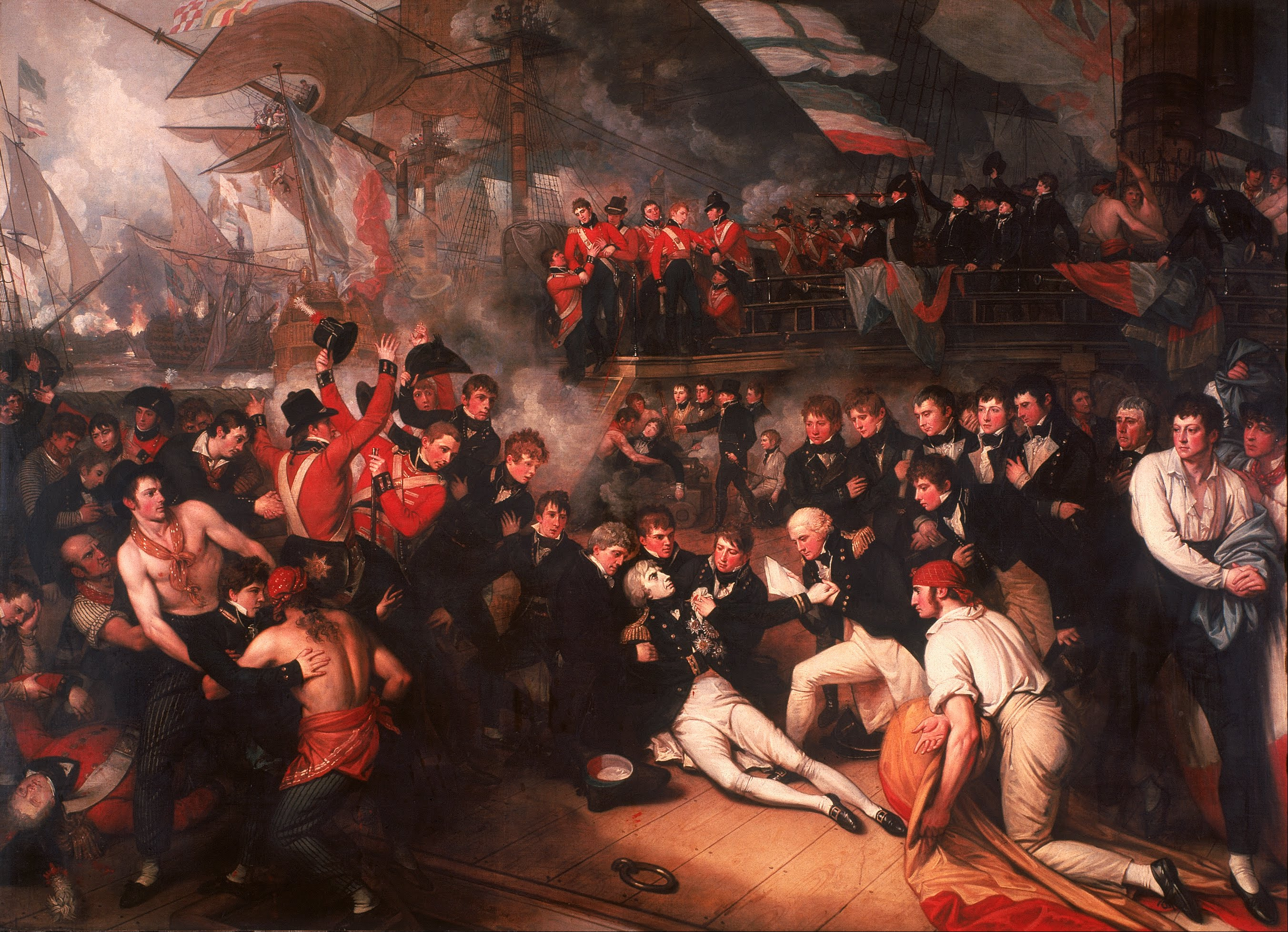
Benjamin West
The Death of Nelson
1806

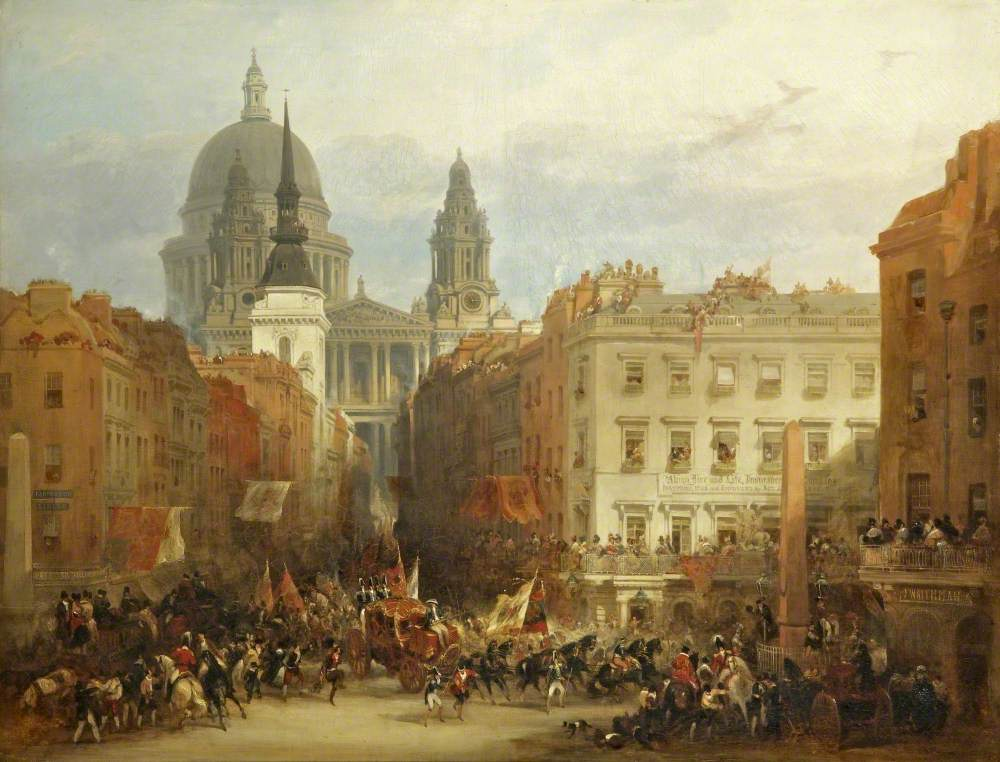
London from Fleet Street by David Roberts, 1837

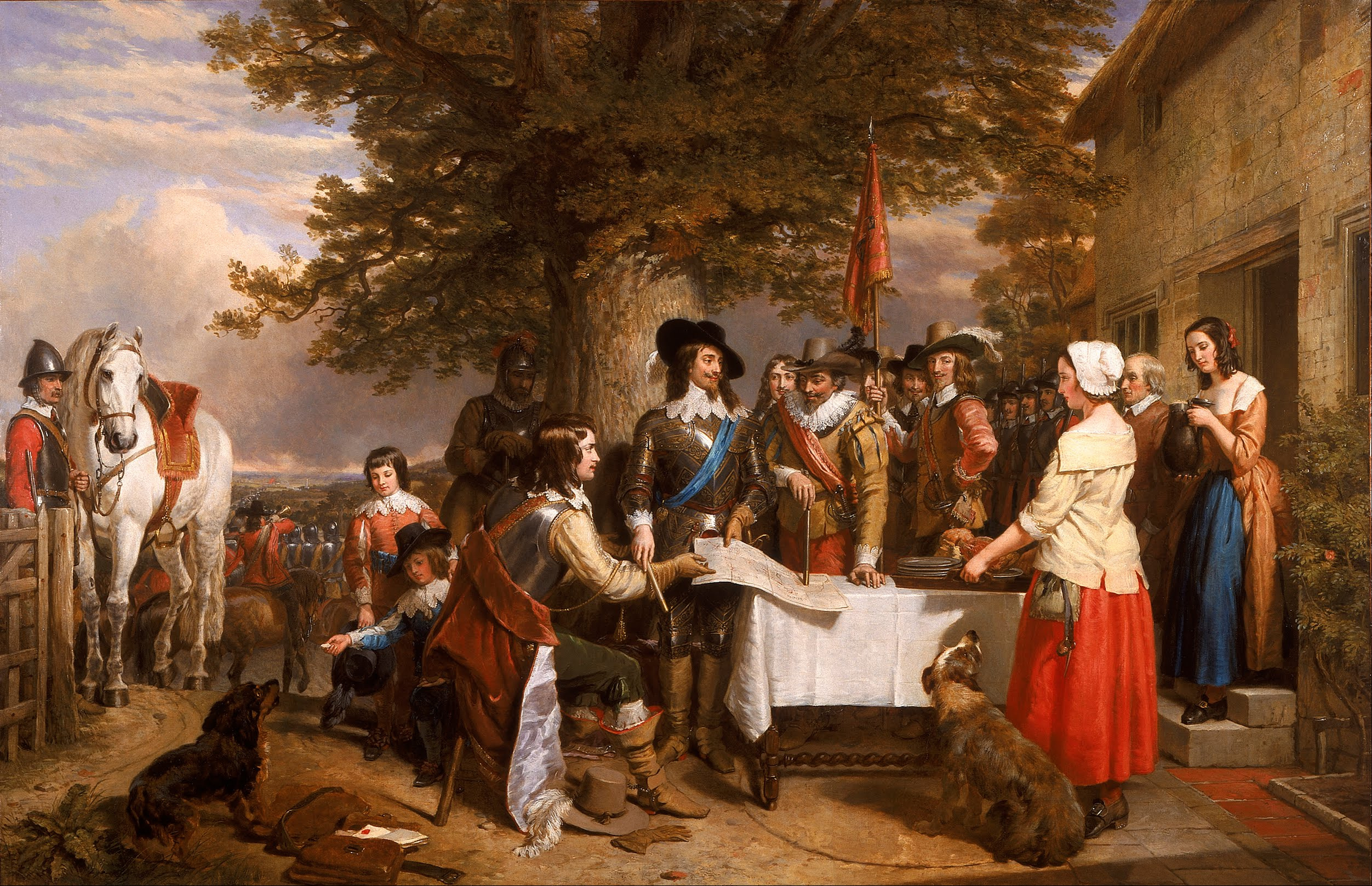
Charles Landseer
The Eve of the Battle of Edgehill,
1845

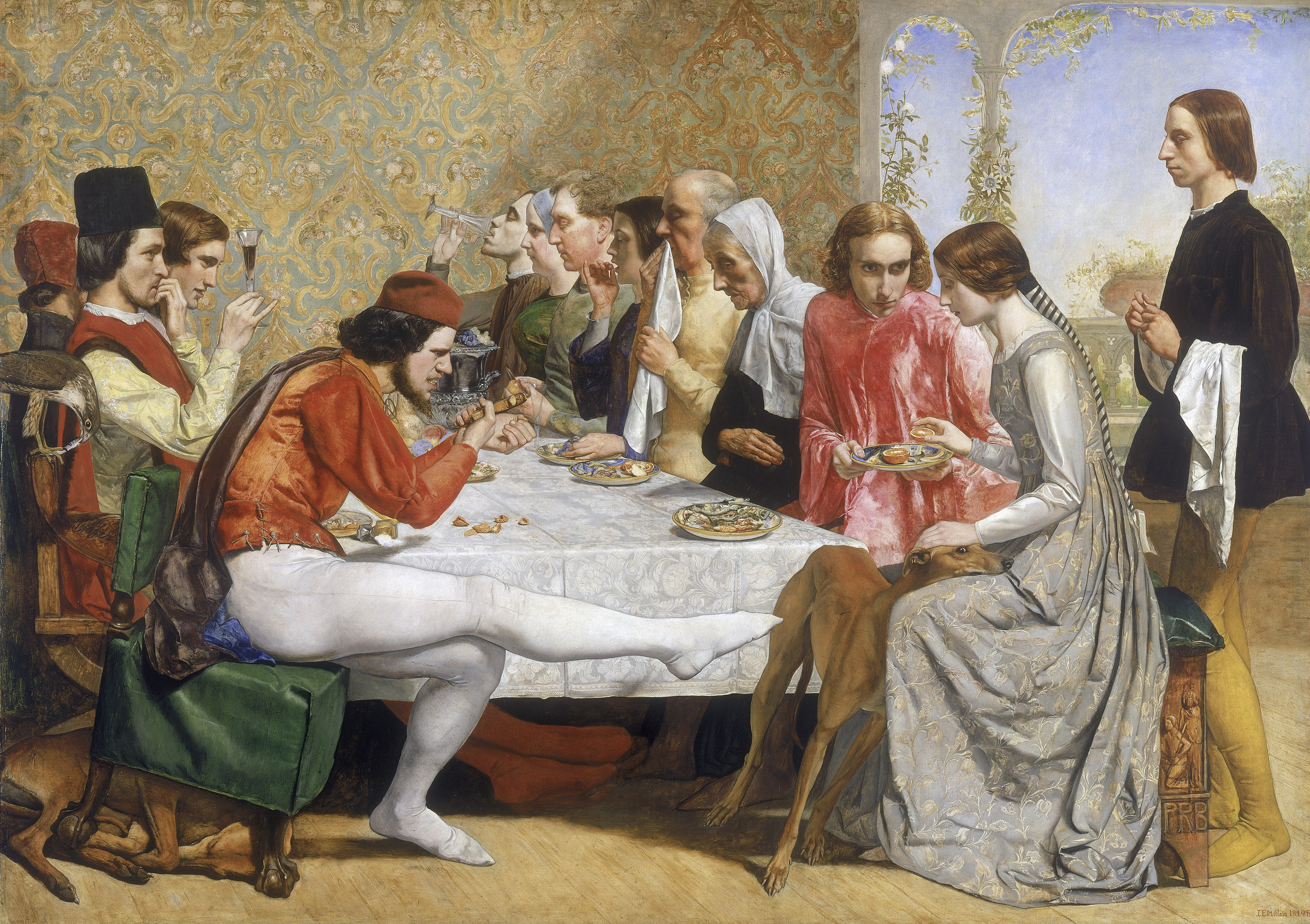
John Everett Millais
Isabella
1849

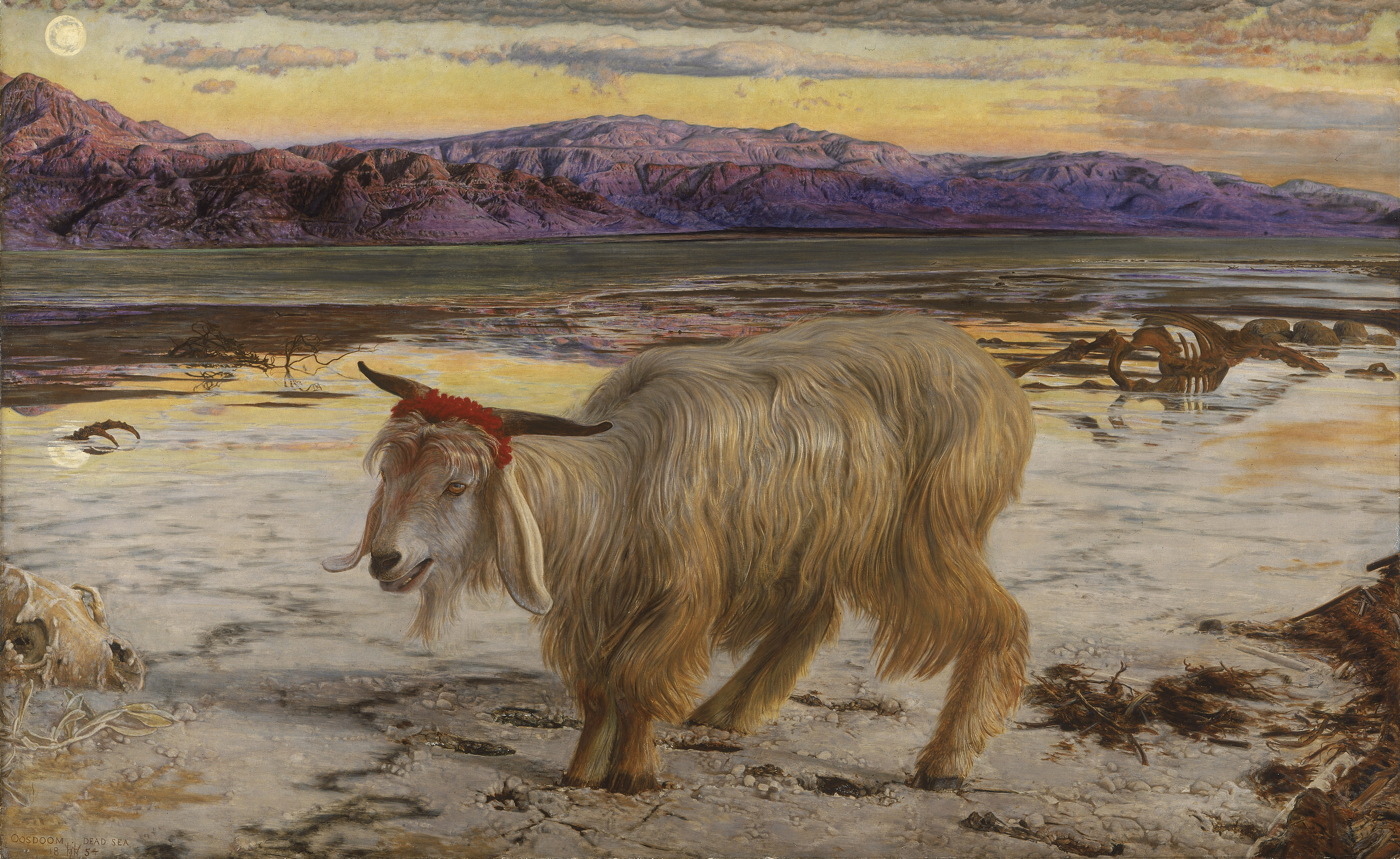
William Holman Hunt
The Scapegoat
1854

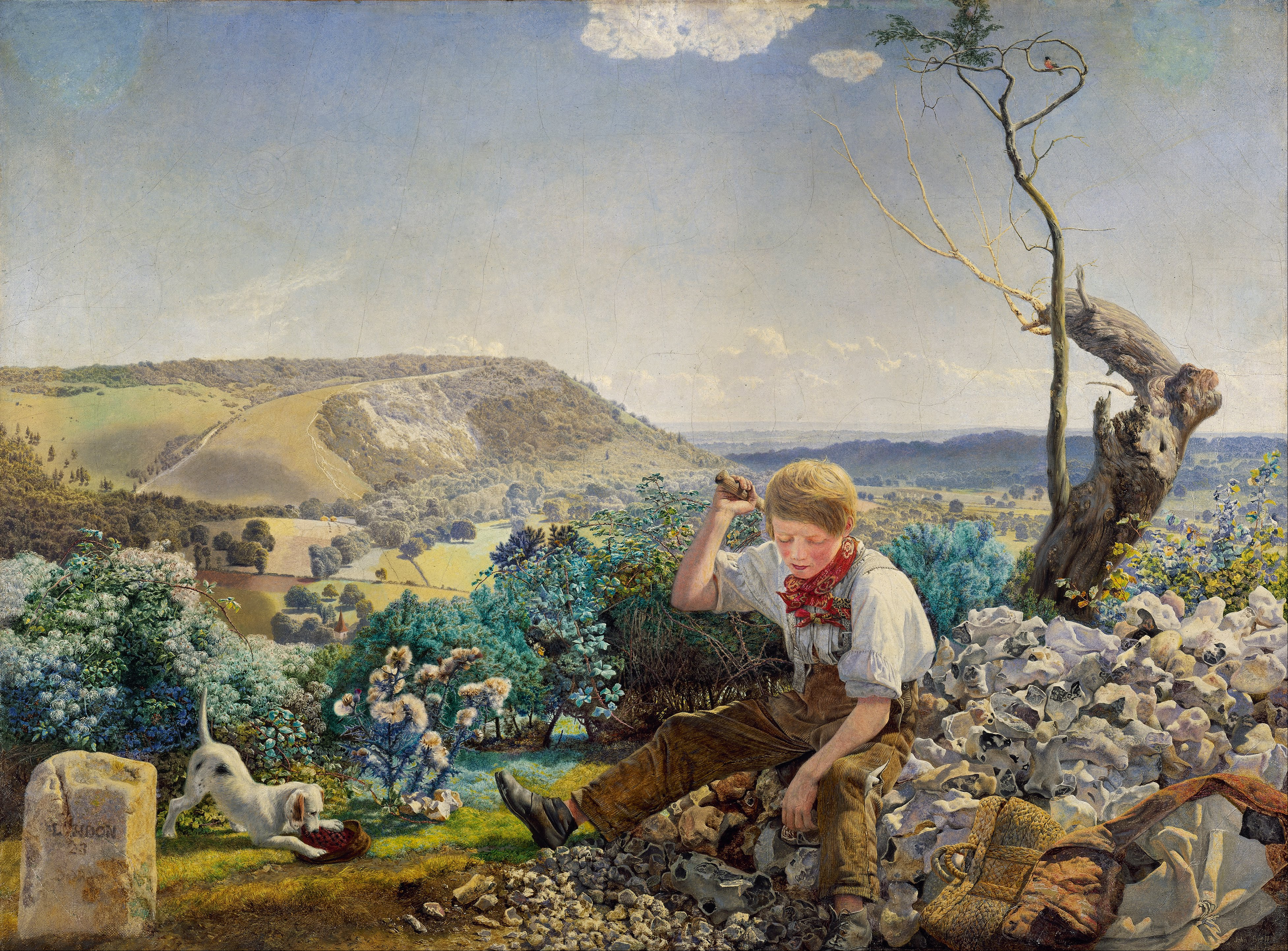
John Brett
The Stonebreaker
1857–1858

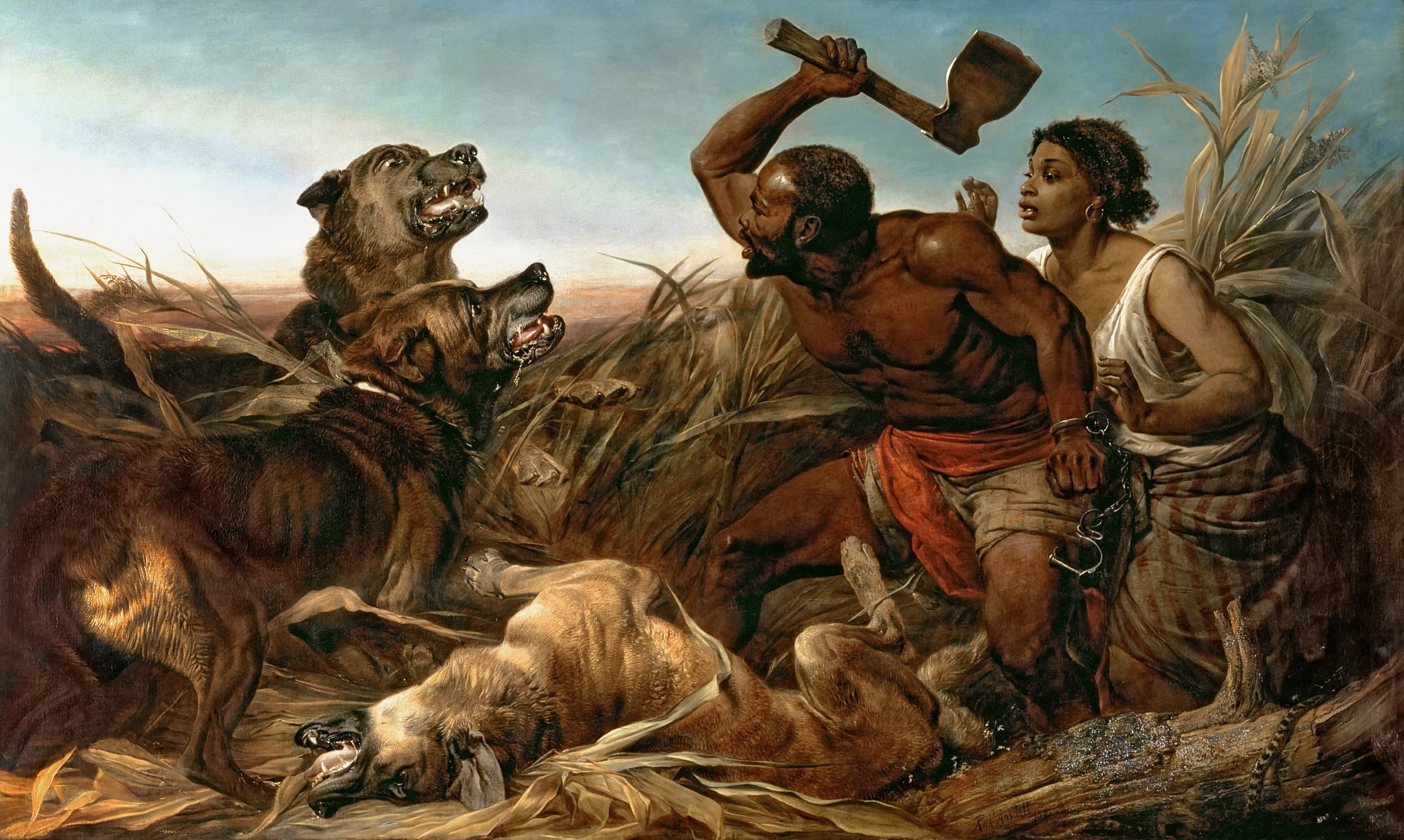
Richard Ansdell
The Hunted Slaves
1861

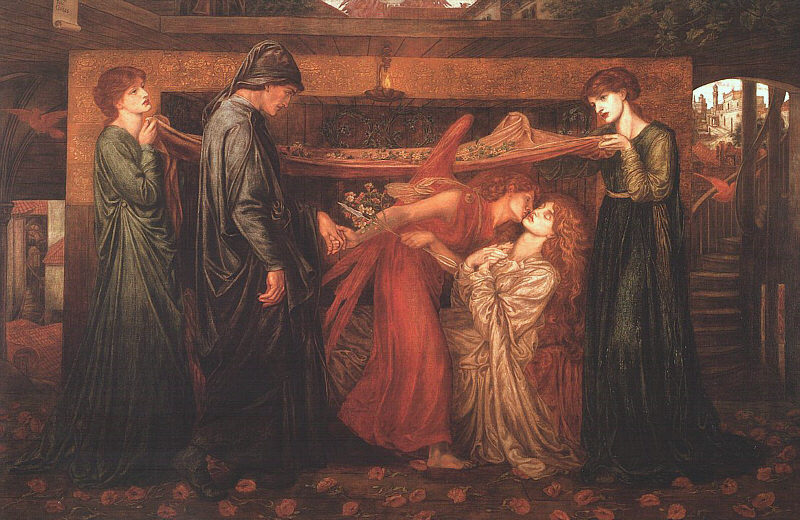
Dante Gabriel Rossetti
Dante's Dream
1871

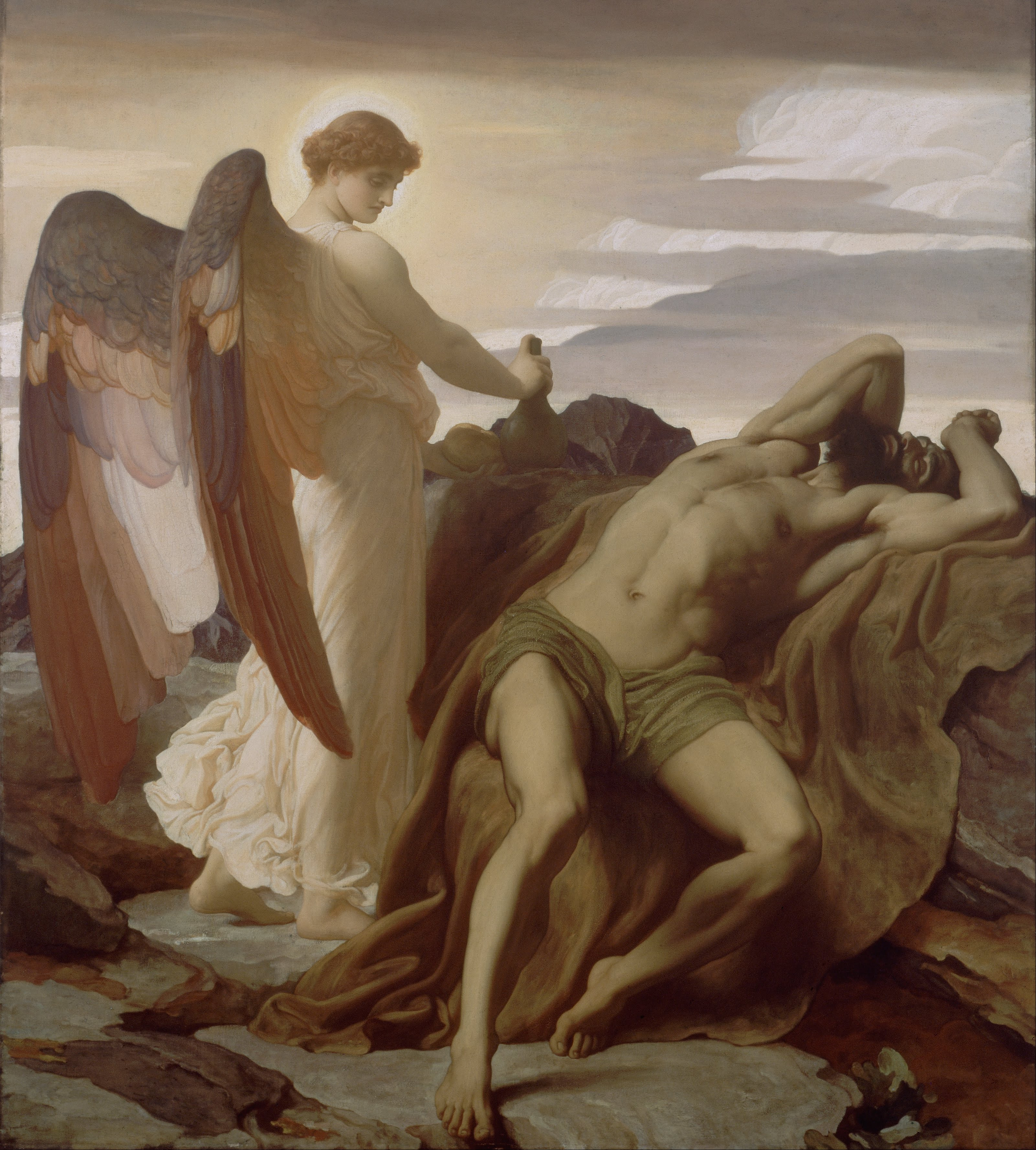
Frederic Leighton
Elijah in the Wilderness
1877–1878

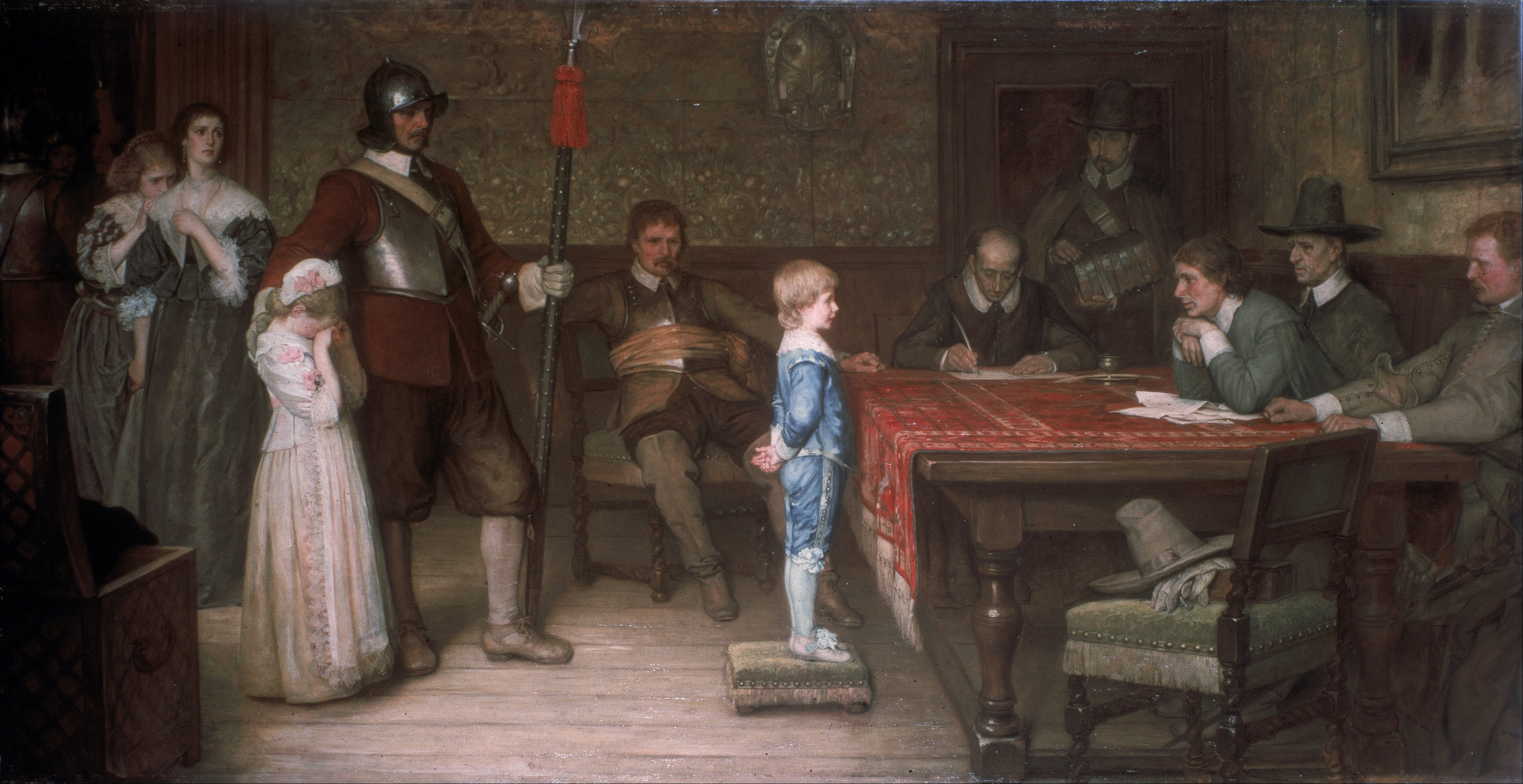
William Frederick Yeames
And when did you last see your father?
1878

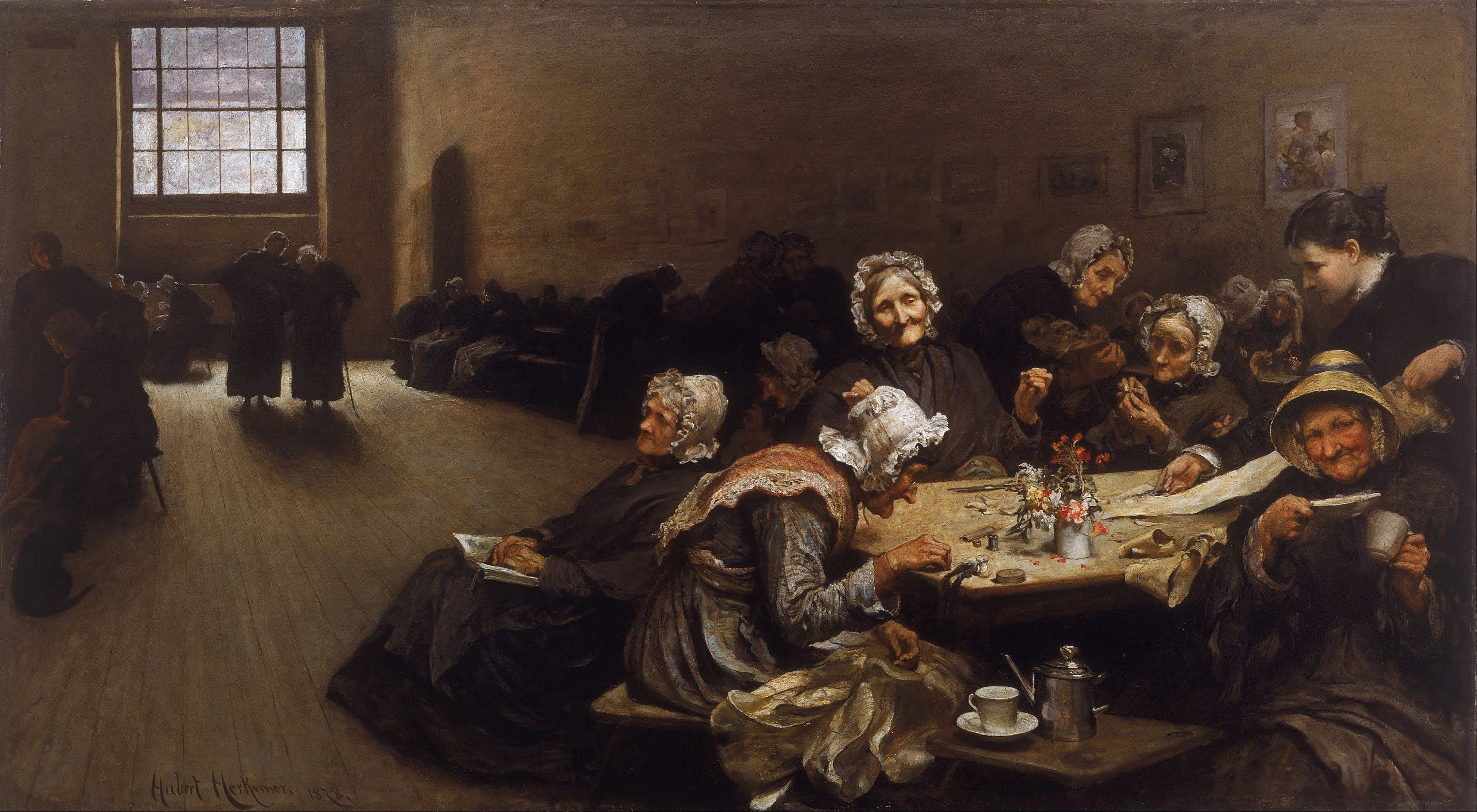
Hubert von Herkomer
Eventide: A Scene in the Westminster Union
1878

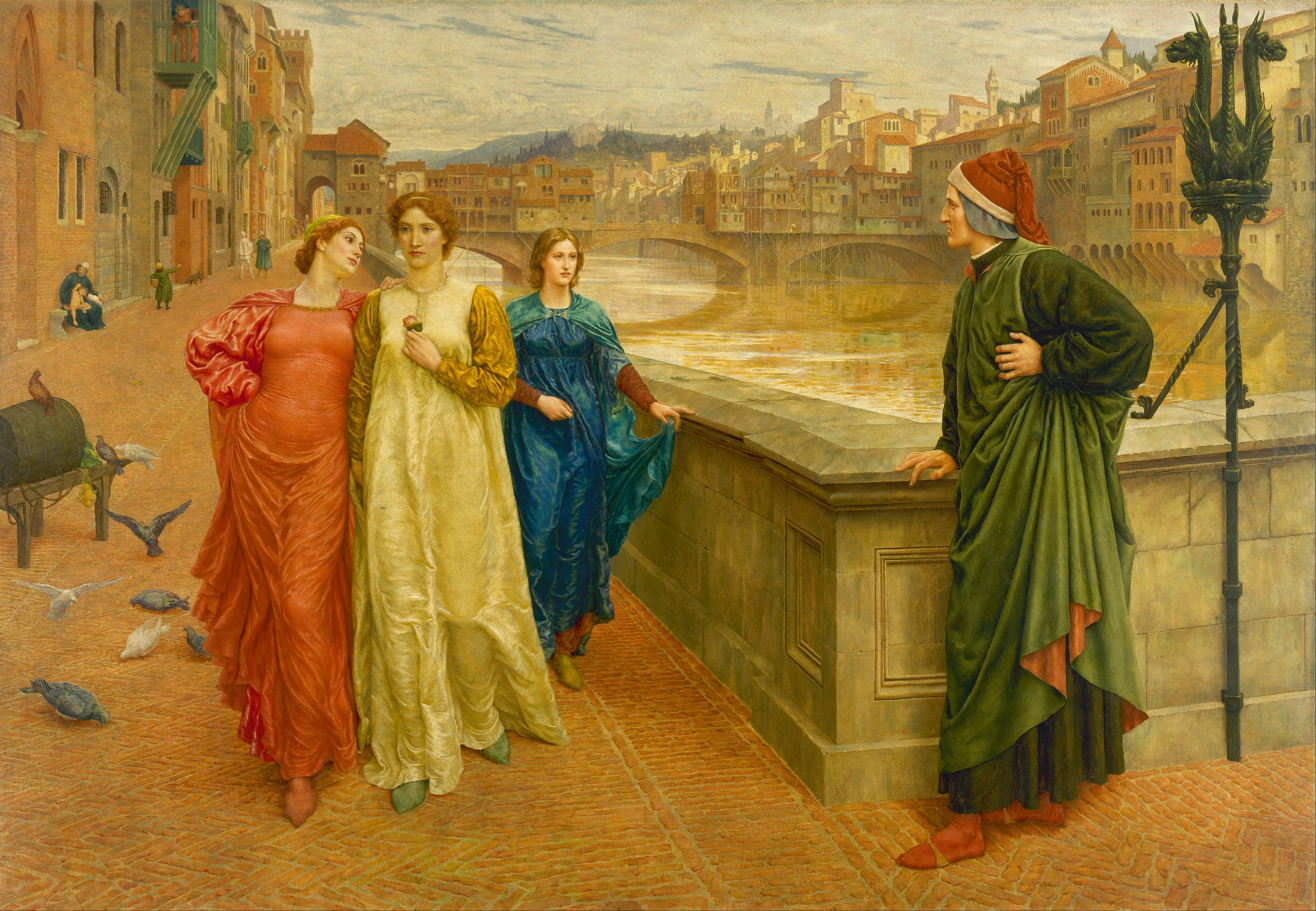
Henry Holiday
Dante and Beatrice
1882–1884

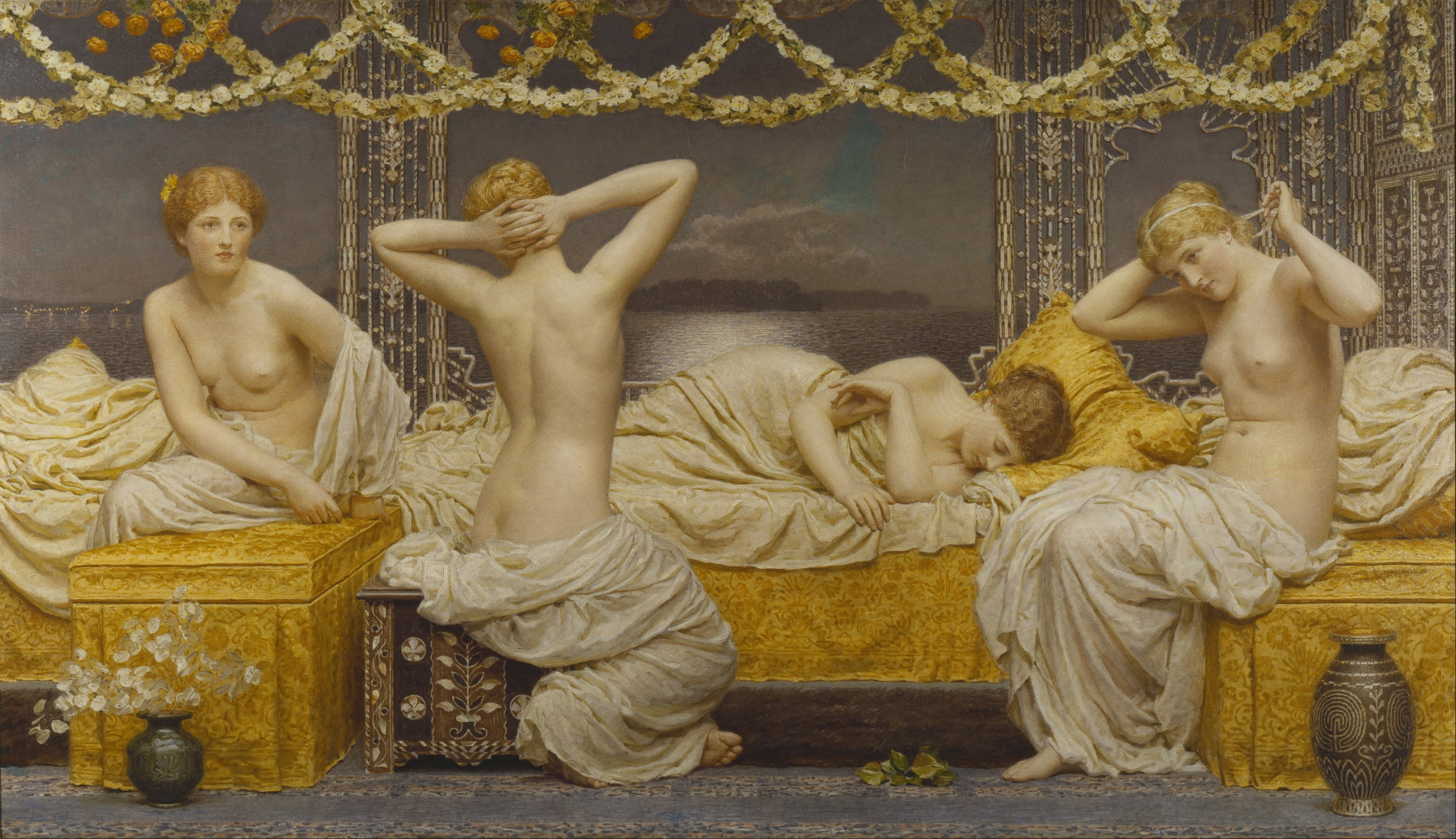
Albert Joseph Moore
A Summer Night
c. 1887

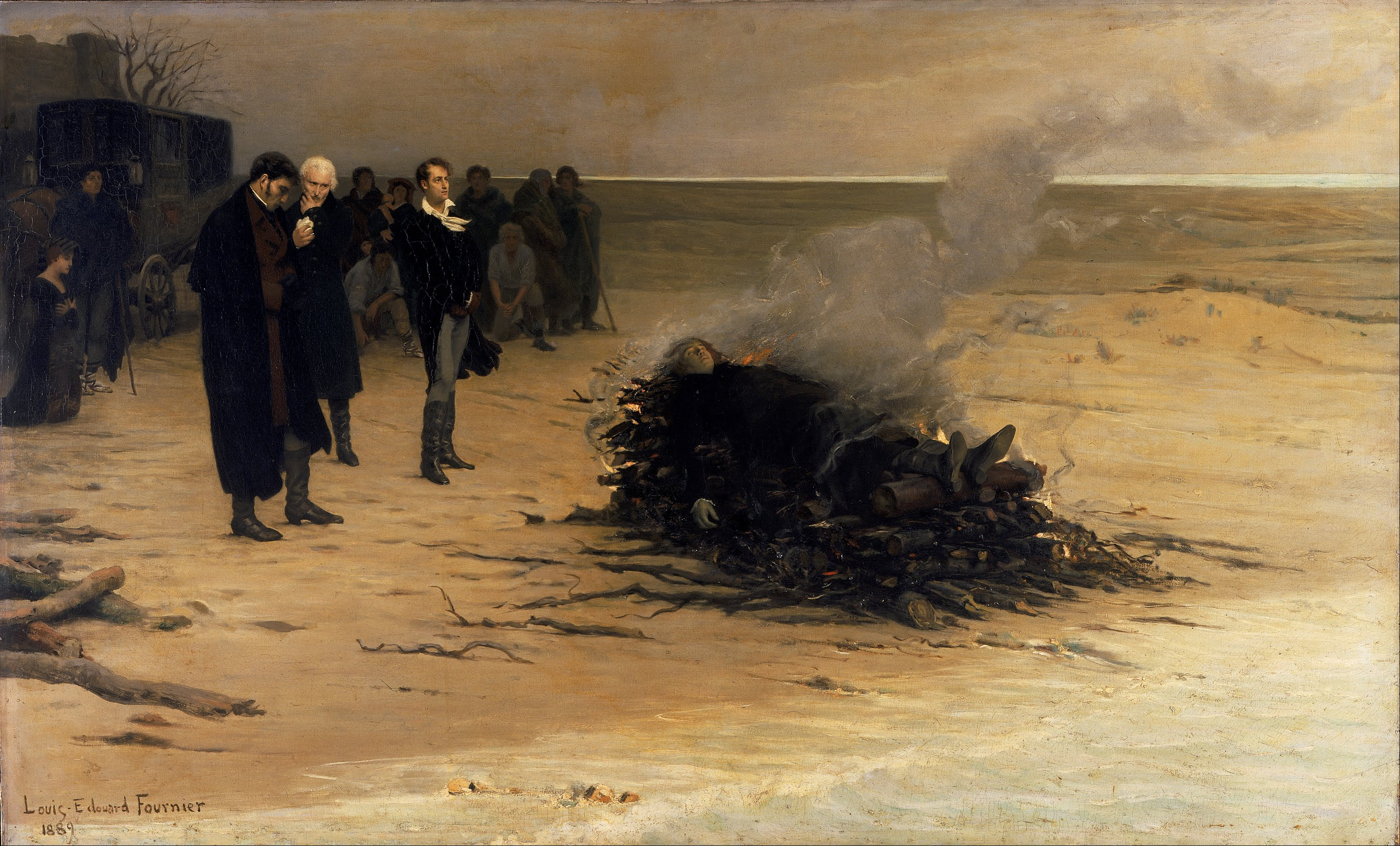
Louis Edouard Fournier
The Funeral of Shelley
1889

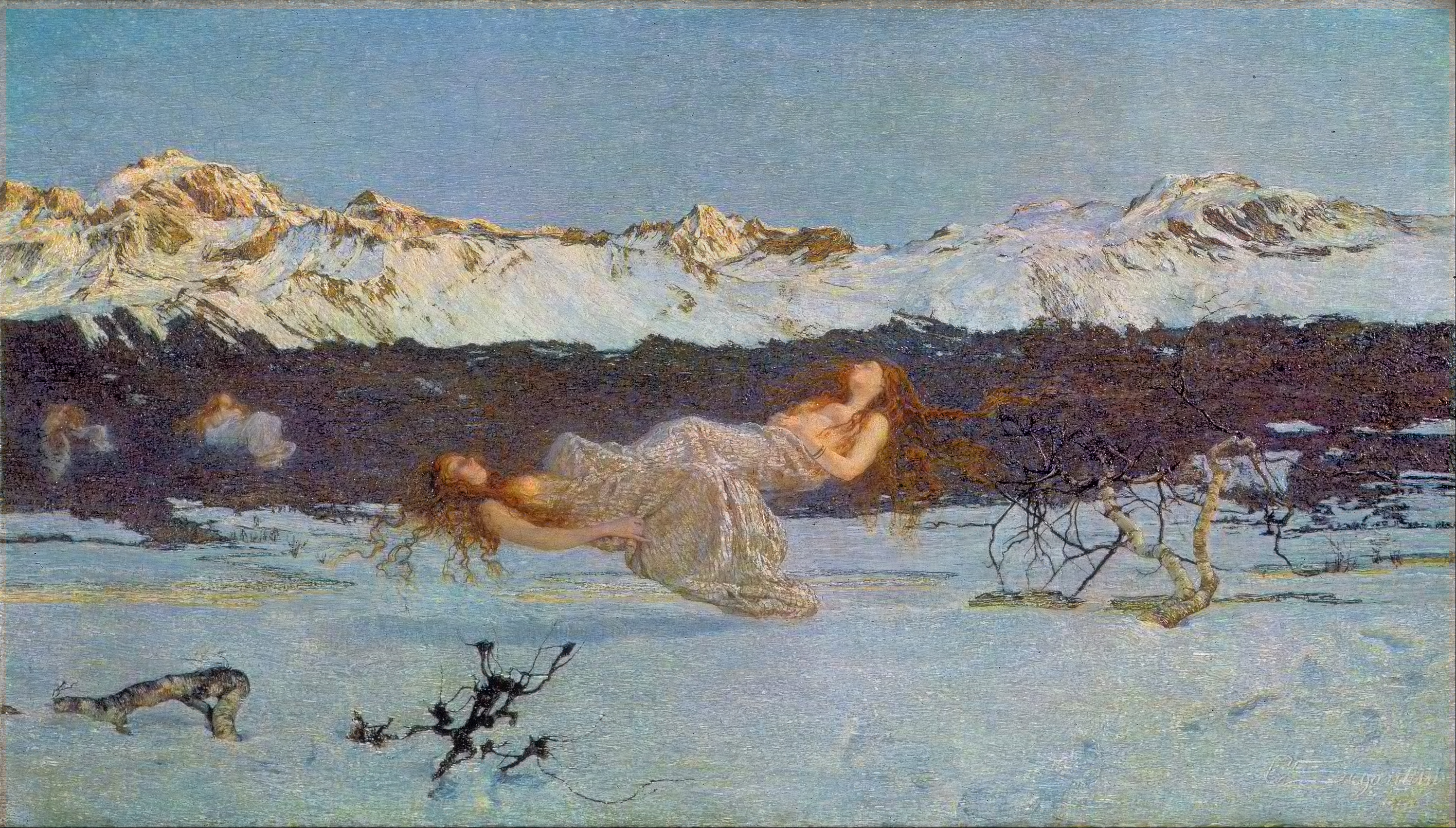
Giovanni Segantini
The Punishment of Lust
1891

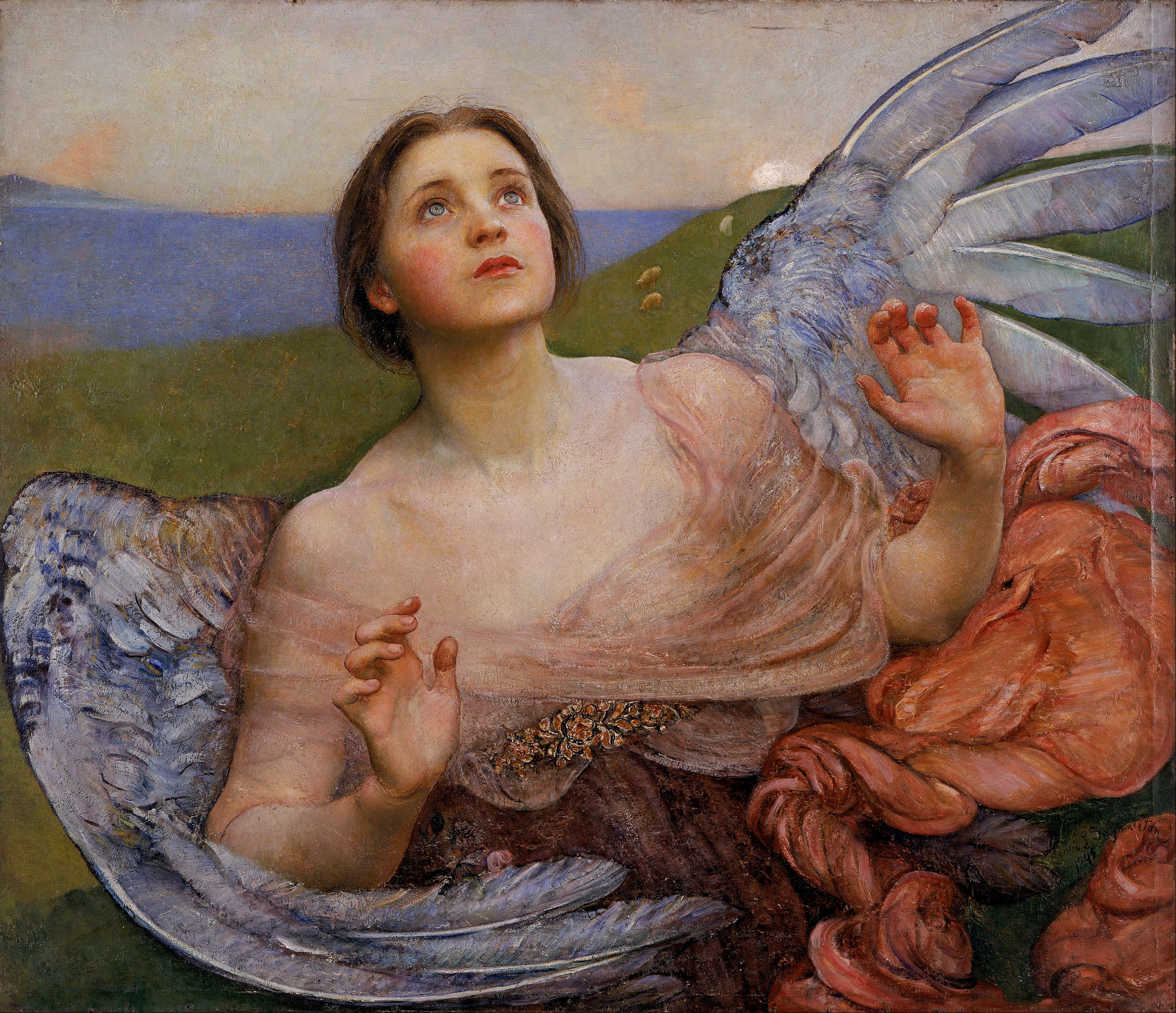
Annie Swynnerton
The Sense of Sight
1895

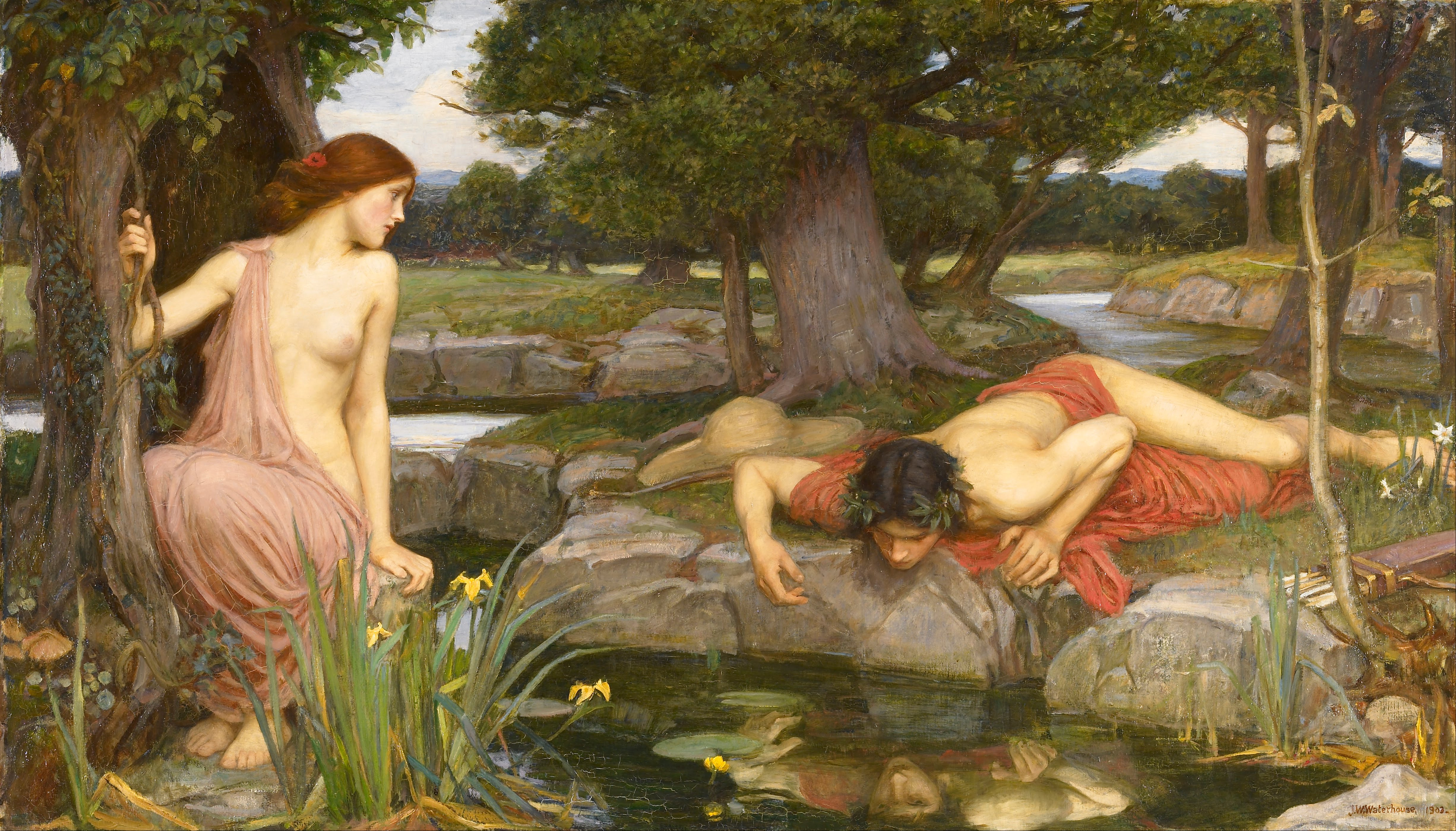
John William Waterhouse
Echo and Narcissus
1903
After Hans Holbein the Younger
Portrait of Henry VIII
after 1537

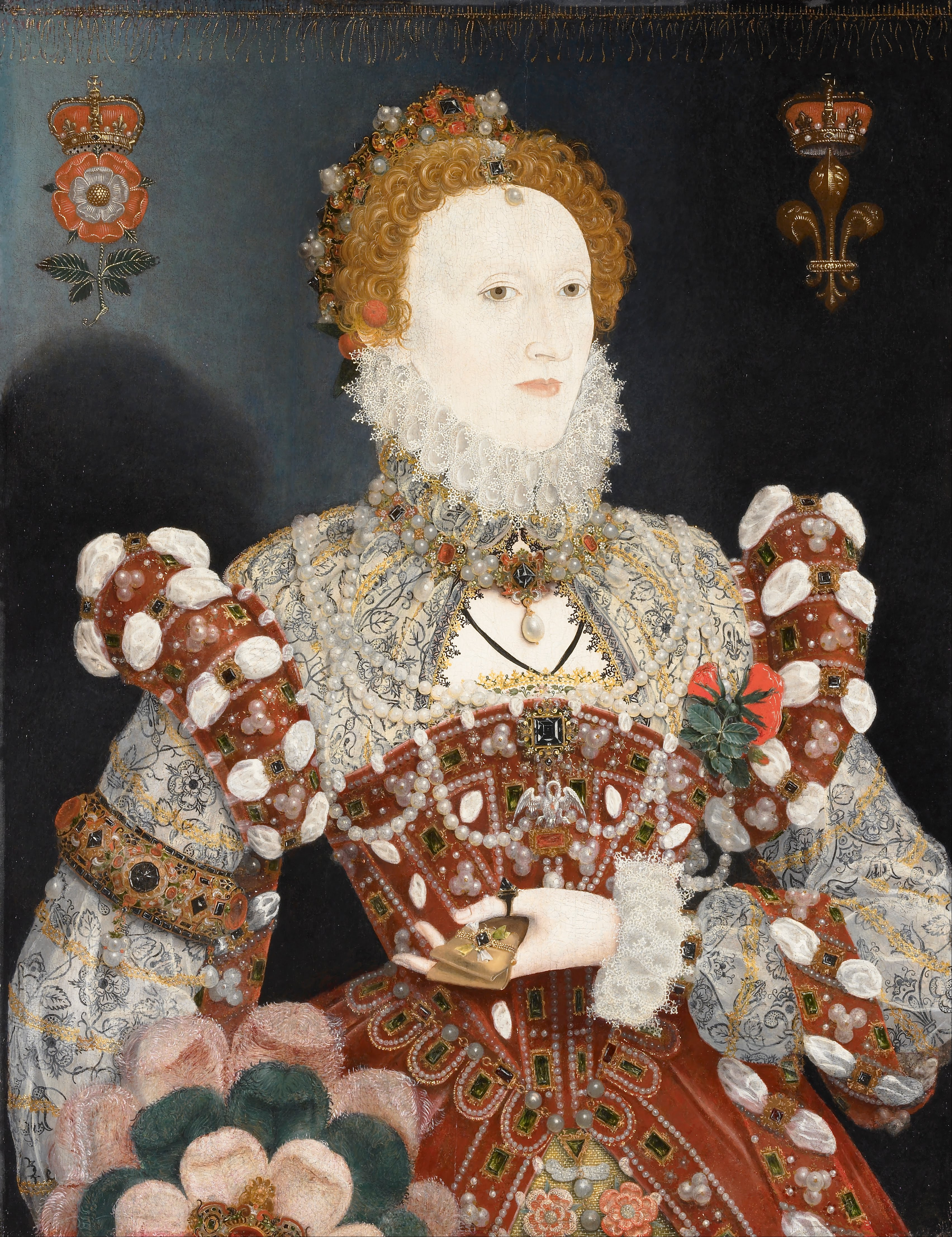
Nicholas Hilliard
Pelican Portrait of Queen Elizabeth I
c. 1573–1575

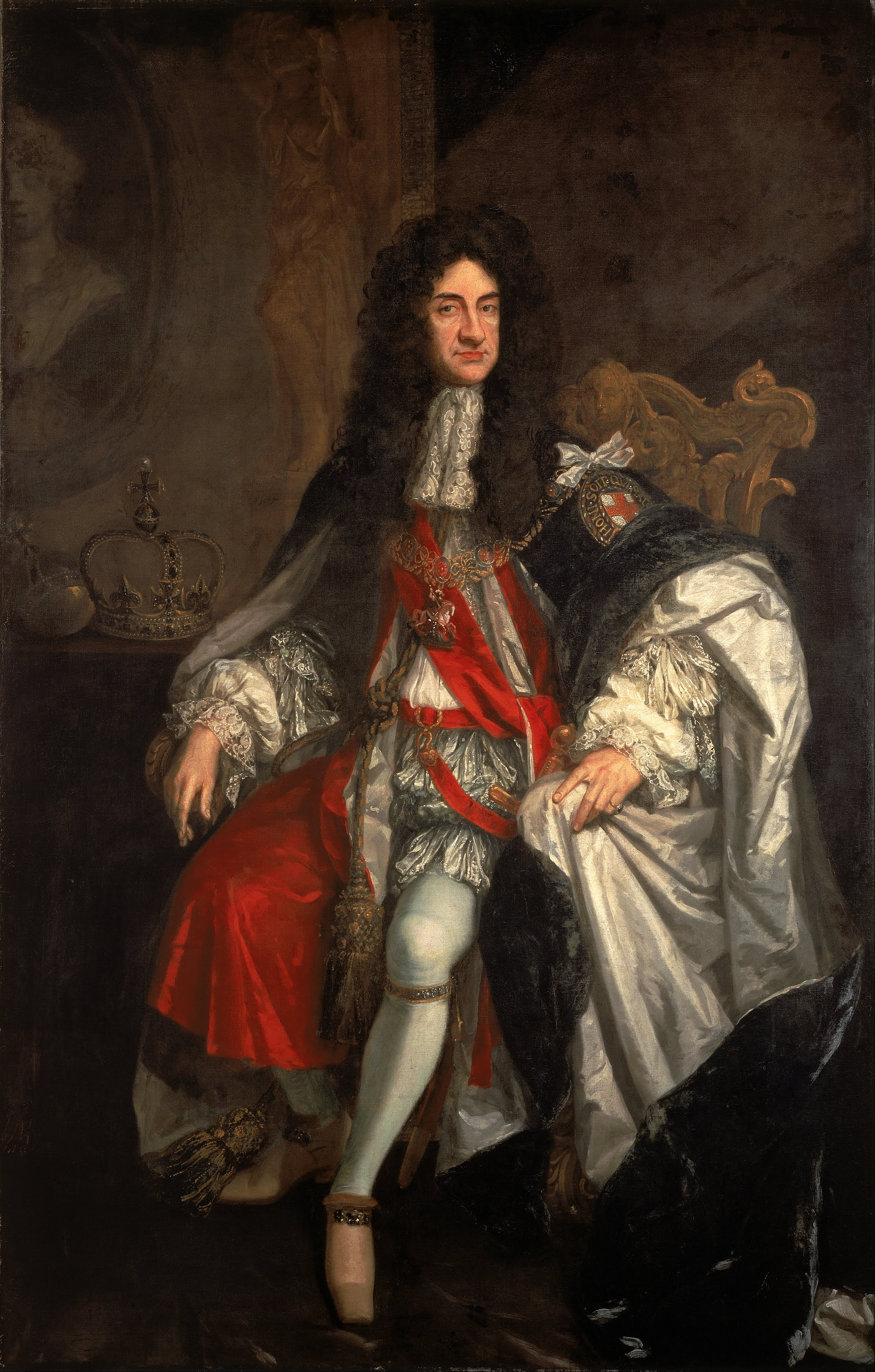
Godfrey Kneller
King Charles II

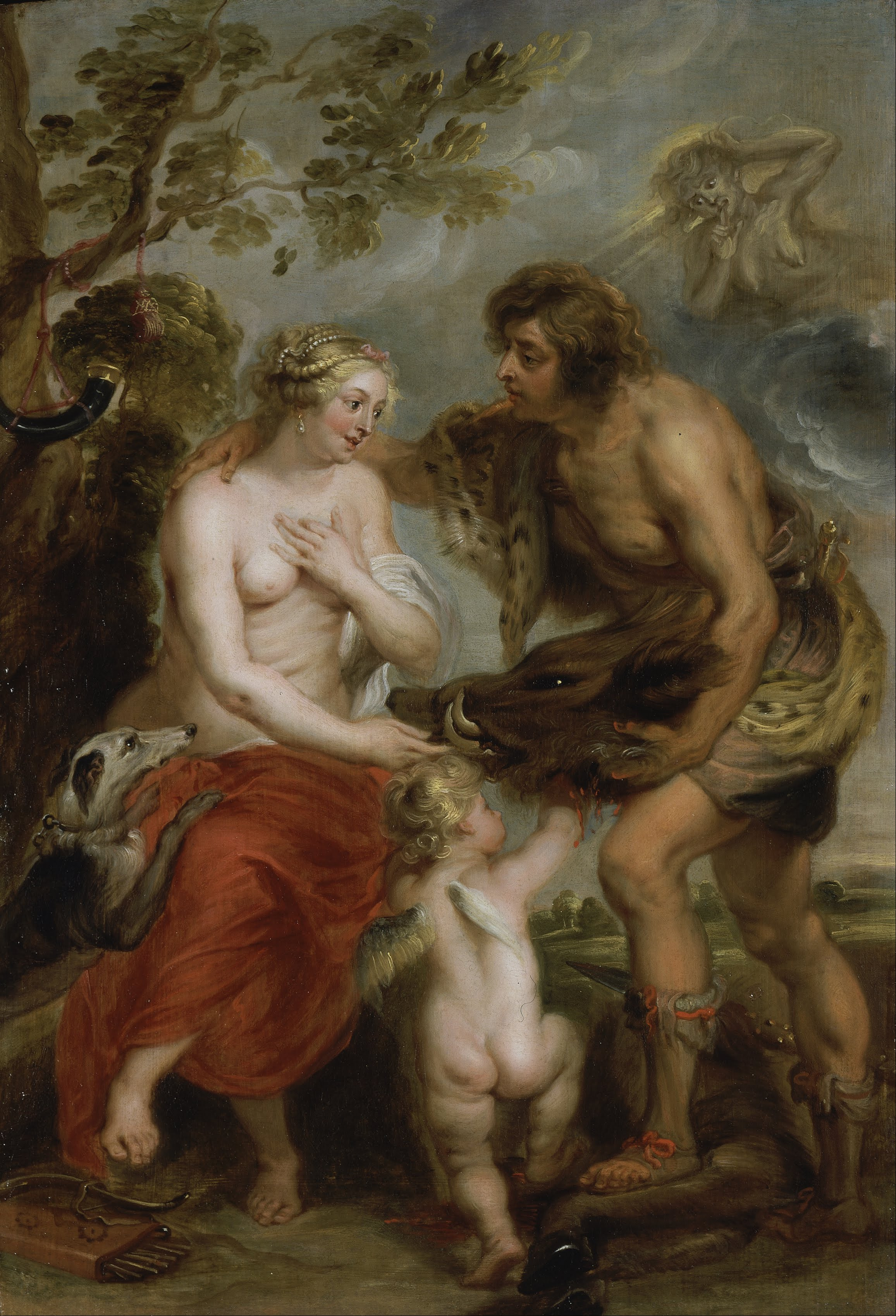
Peter Paul Rubens
Meleager and Atalanta
1635–1637

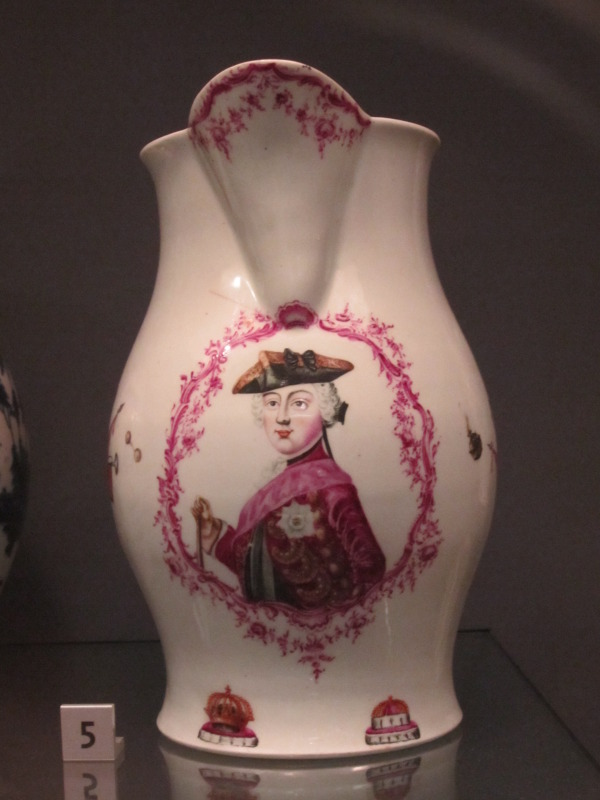
Porcelain jug with image of Frederick of Prussia
c. 1760

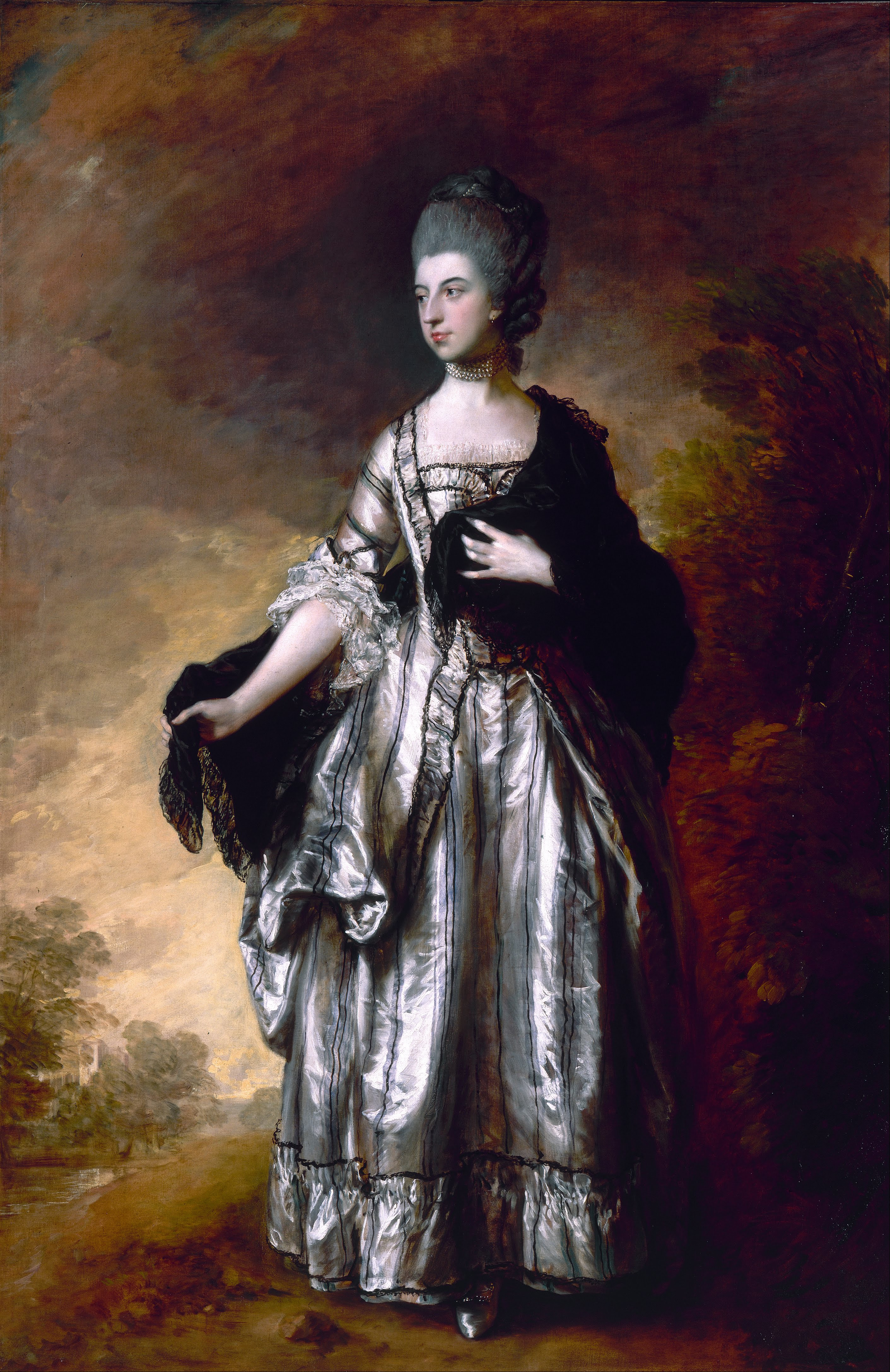
Thomas Gainsborough
Portrait of Lady Molyneux
1769

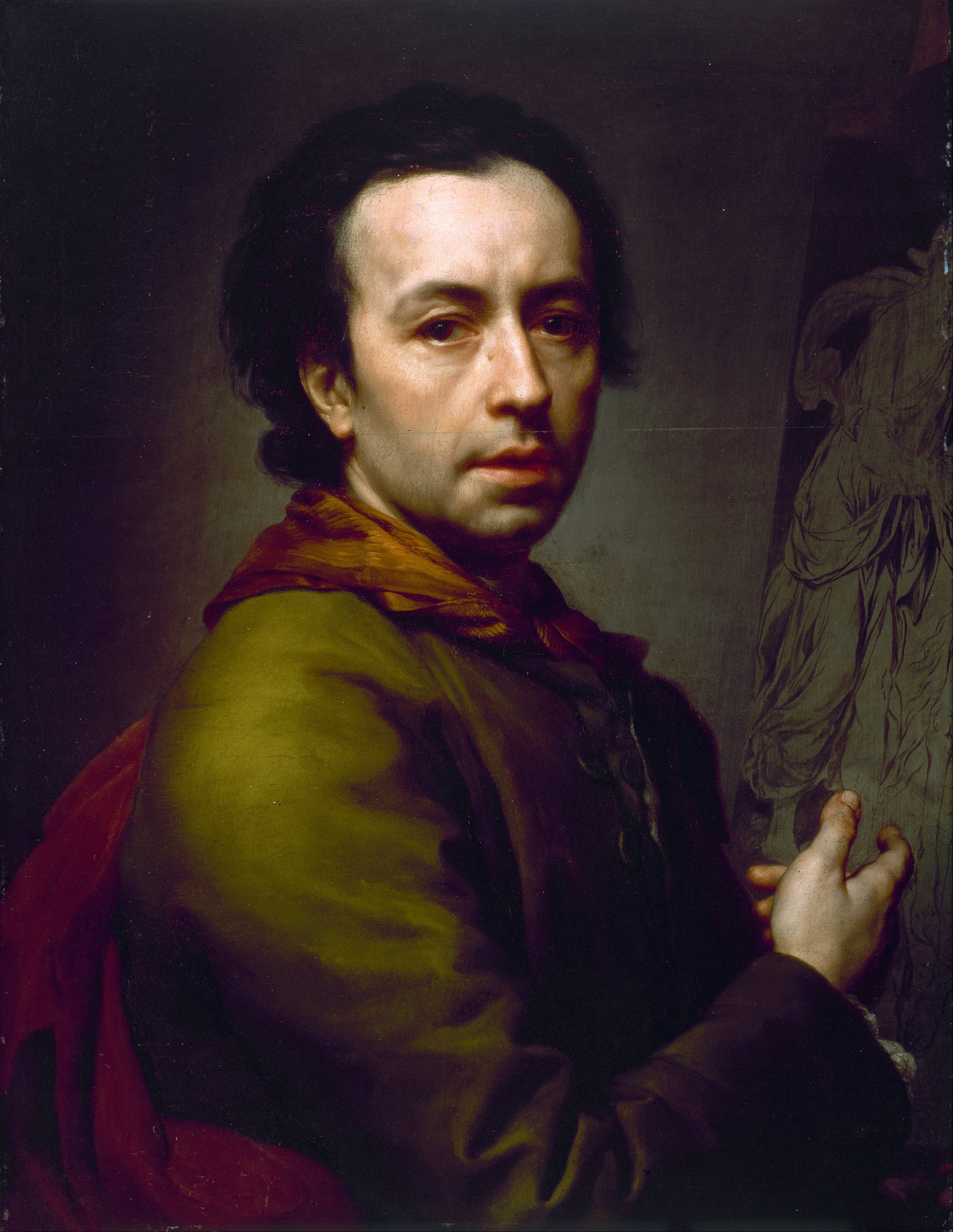
Anton Raphael Mengs
Self-Portrait
1774

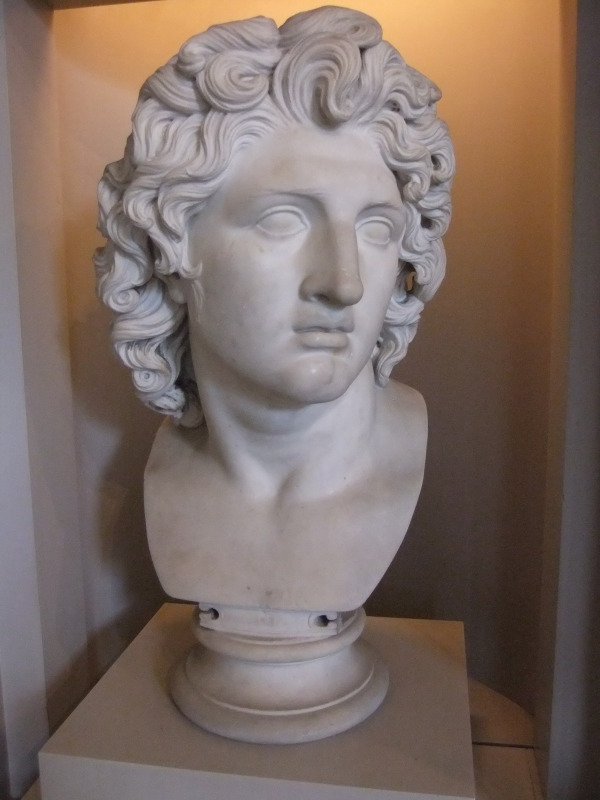
Carlo Albacini
Bust of Alexander the Great
before 1777

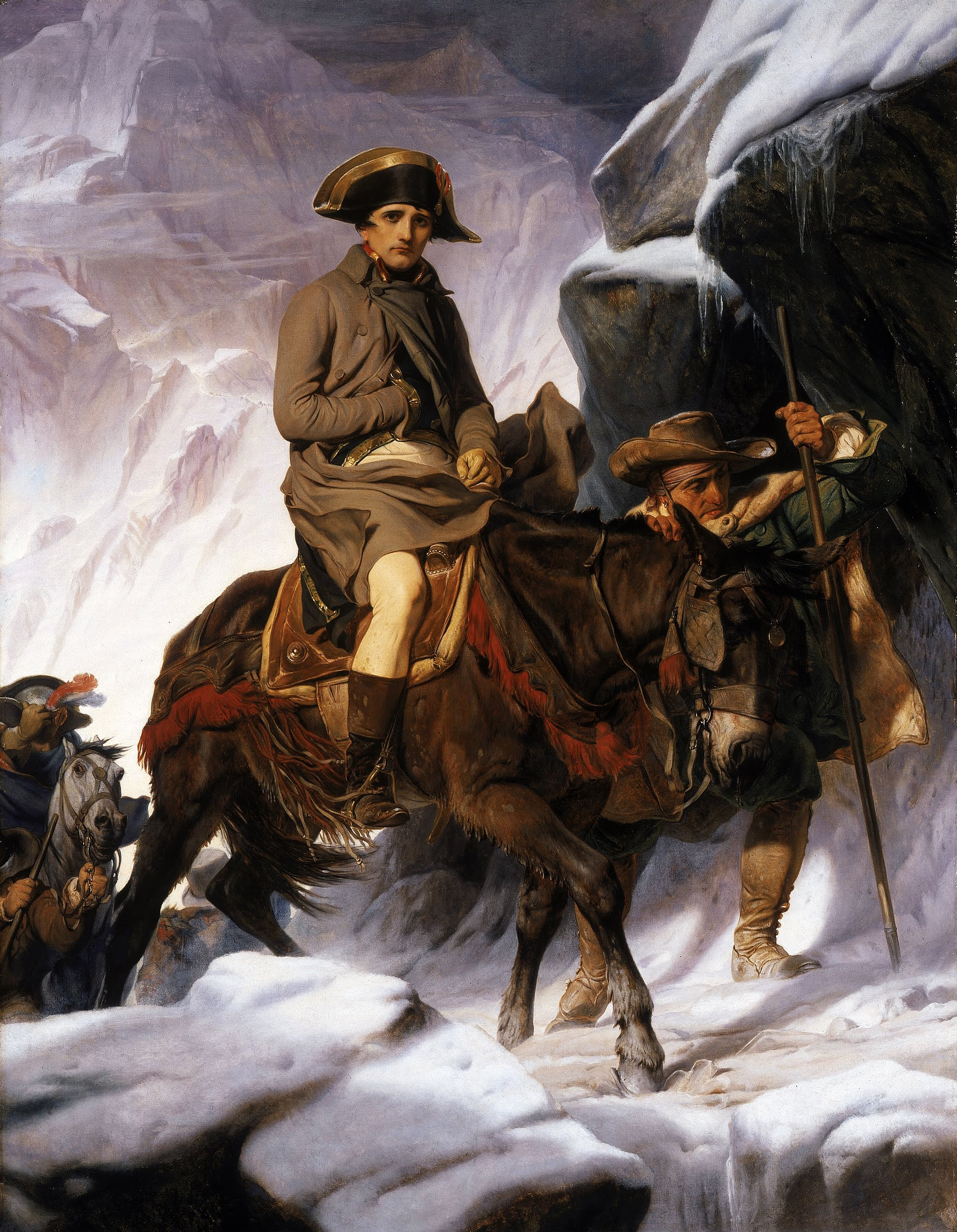
Paul Delaroche
Bonaparte Crossing the Alps
1850

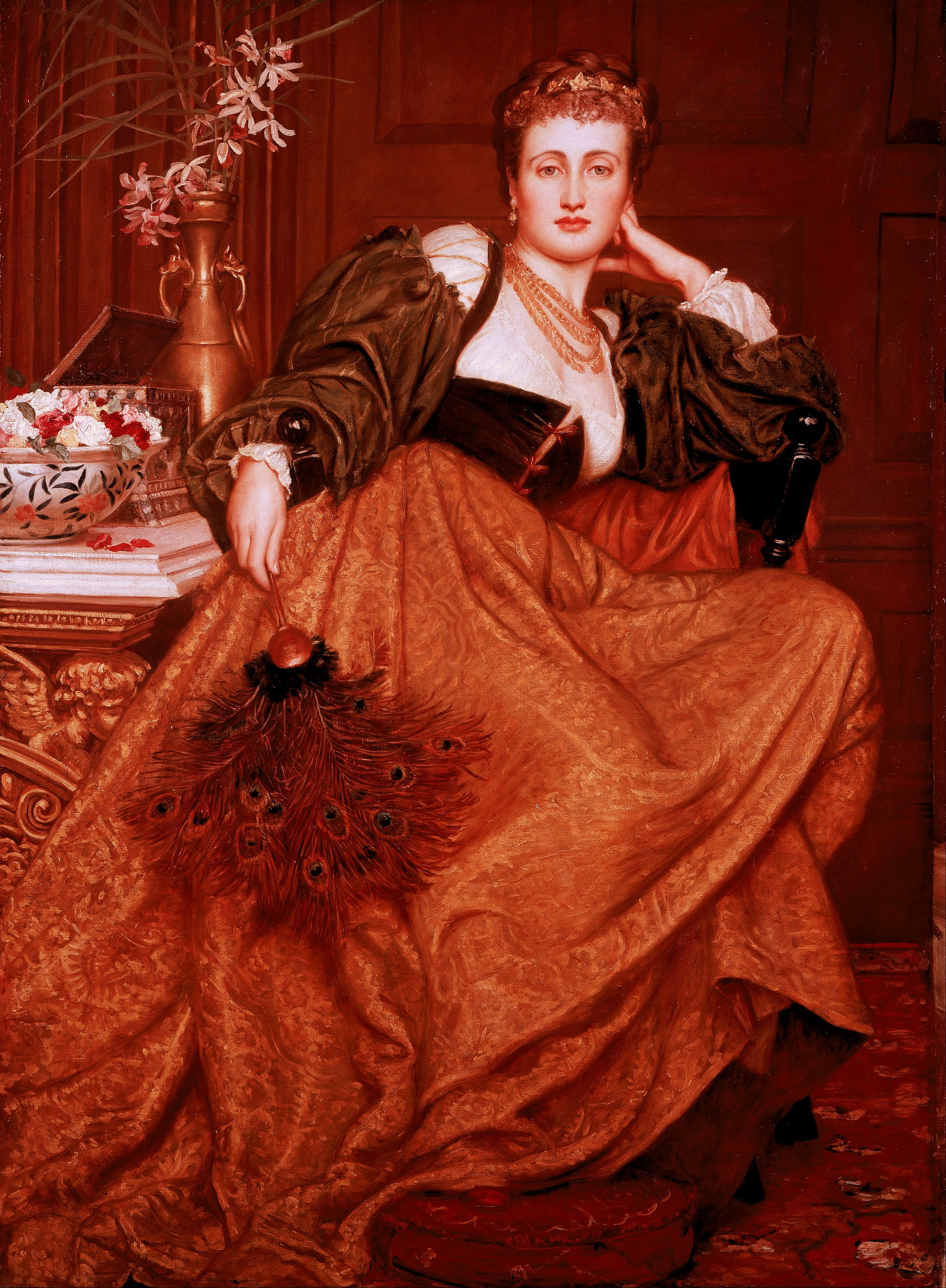
Valentine Cameron Prinsep
Leonora of Mantua
1873

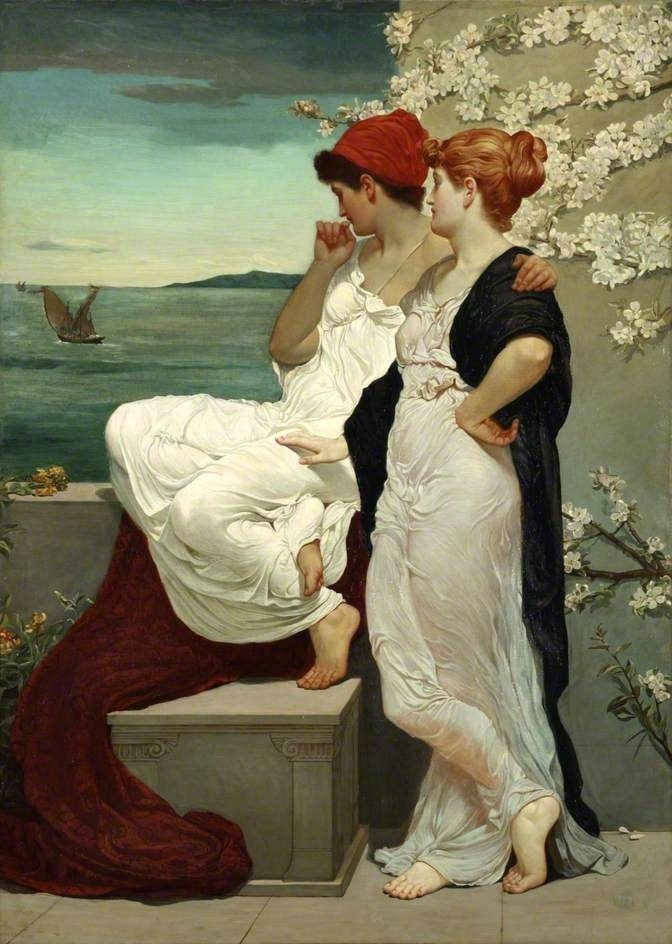
Robert Fowler
Women of Phoenicia
1879

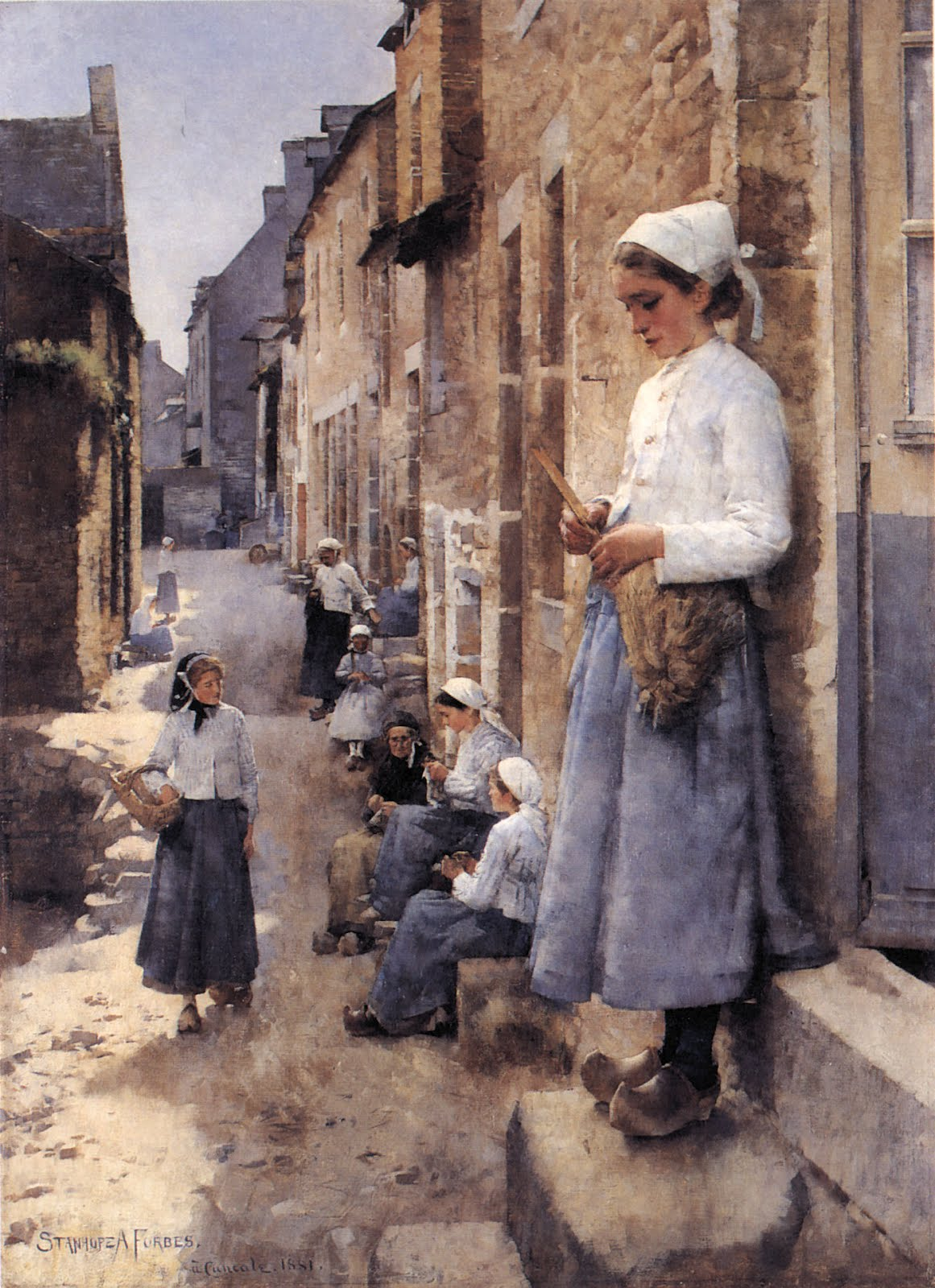
Stanhope Forbes
A Street in Brittany
1881

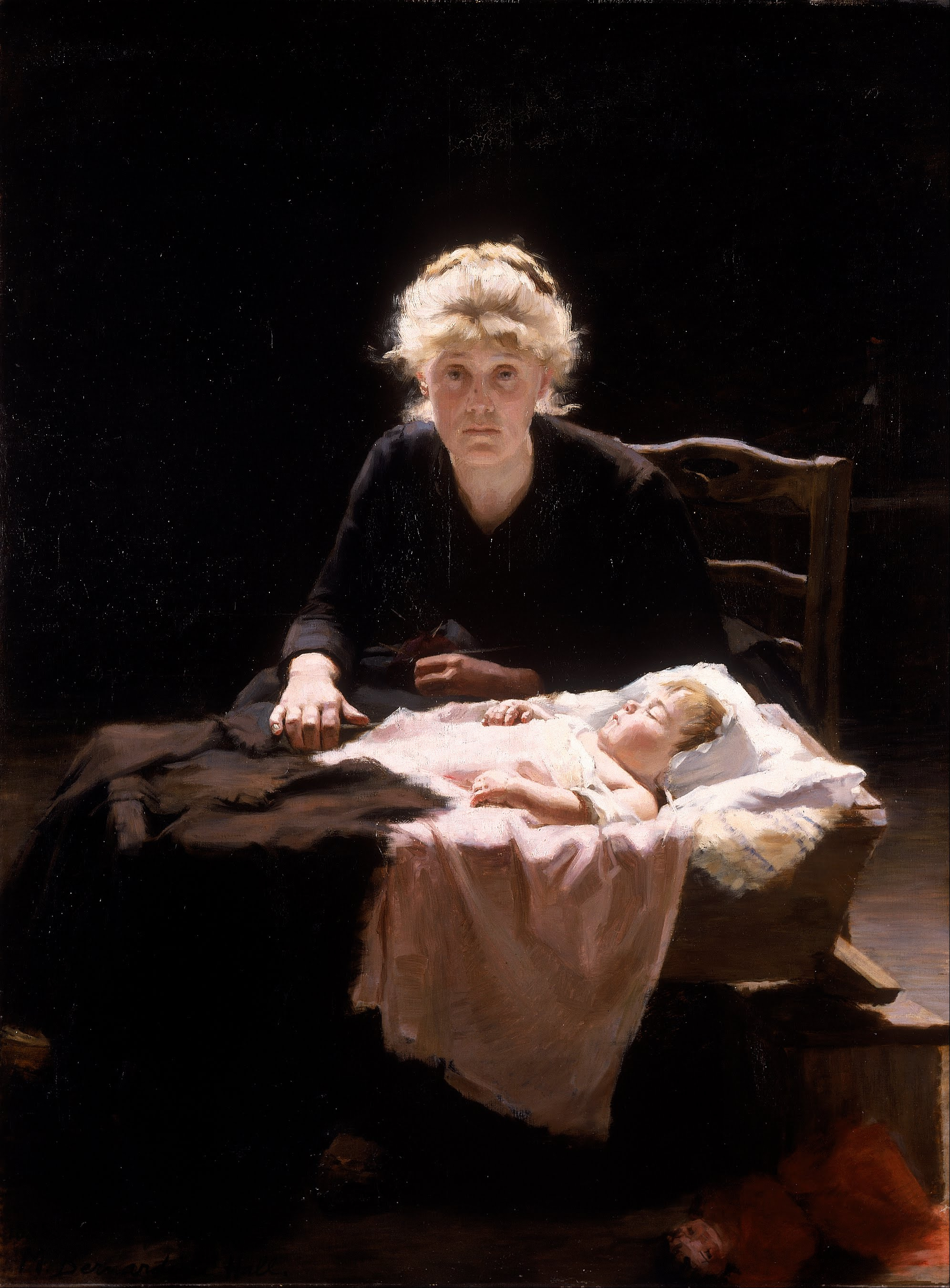
Margaret Bernardine Hall
Fantine
1886

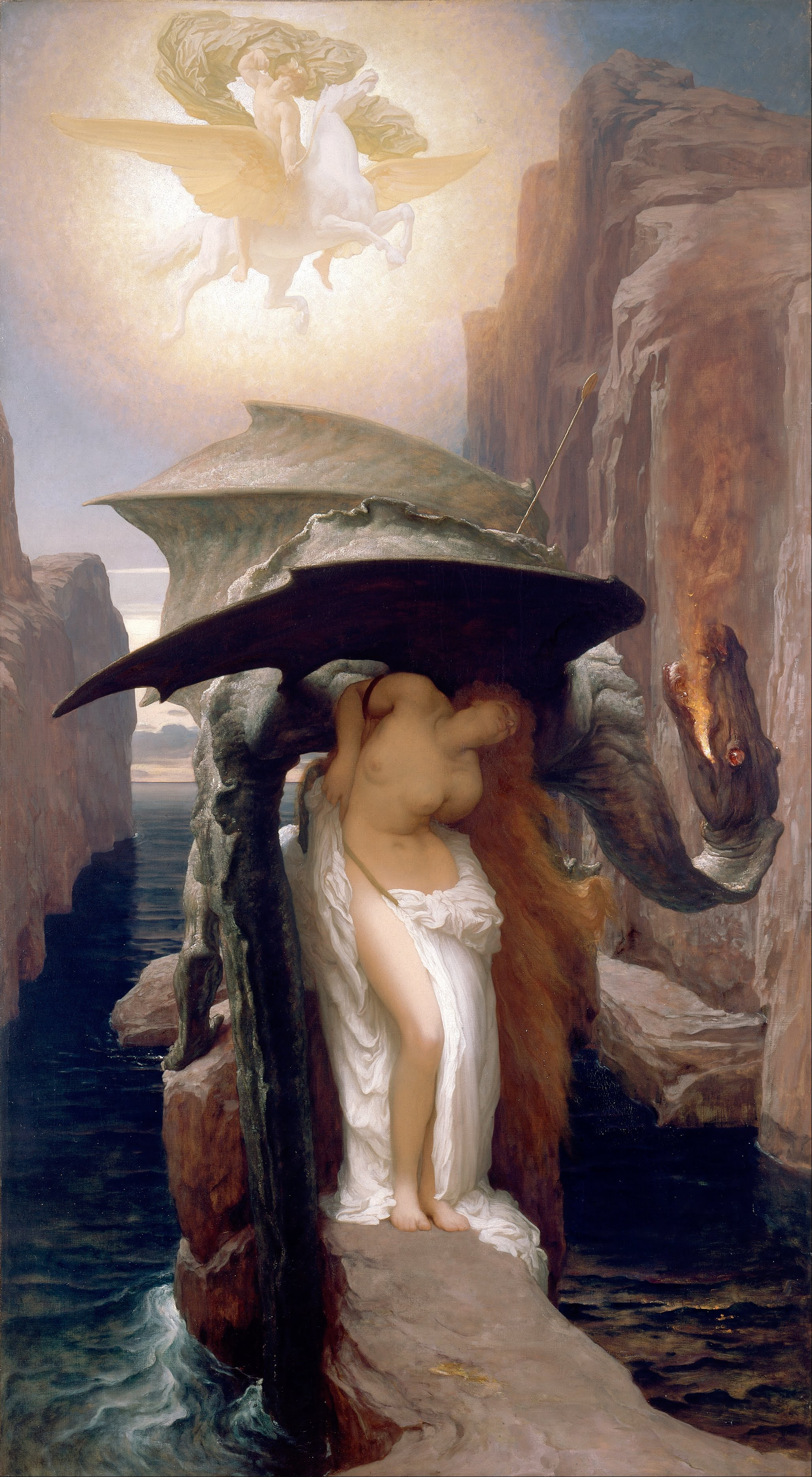
Frederic Leighton
Perseus and Andromeda
1891

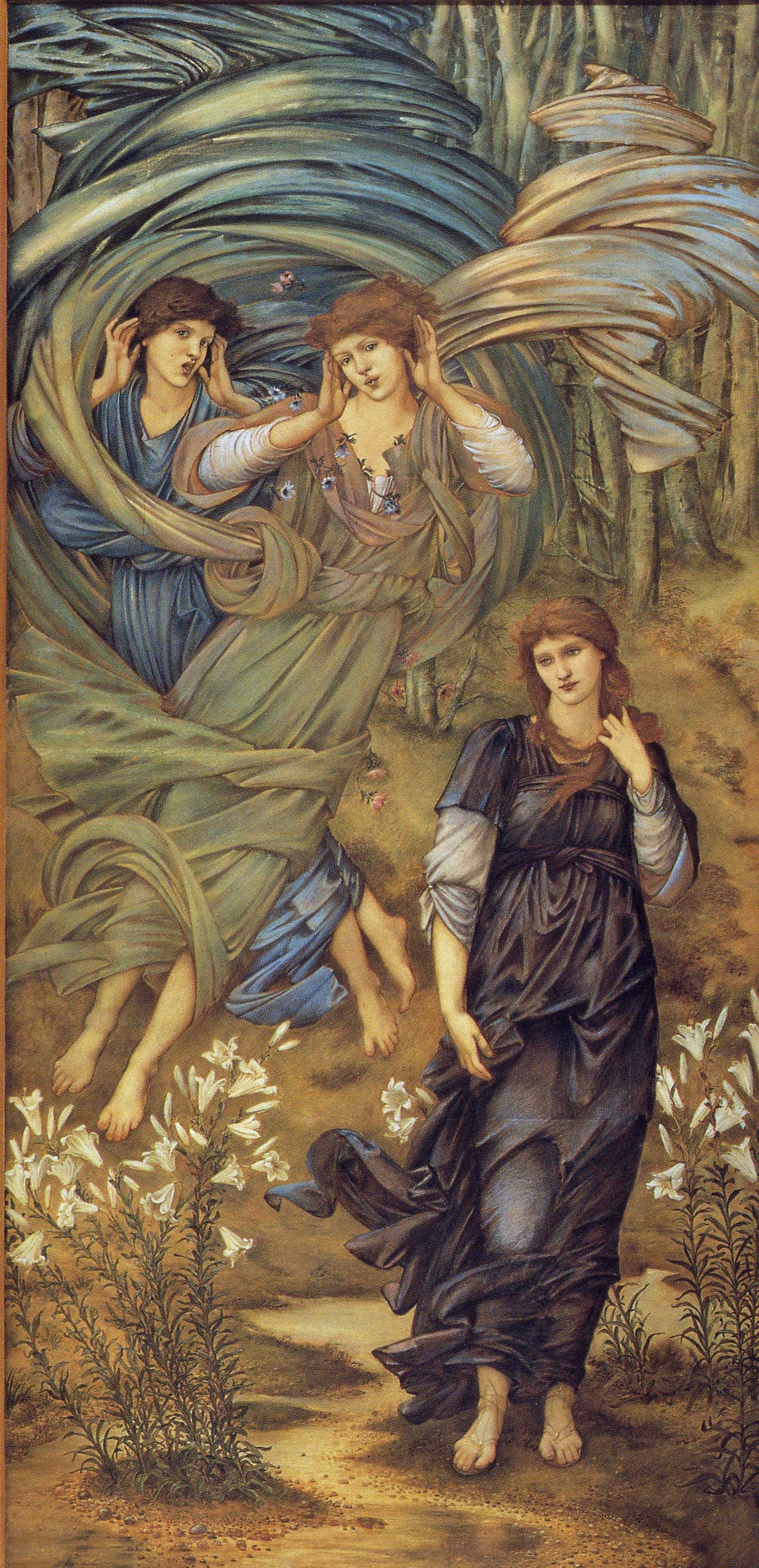
Edward Burne-Jones
Sponsa de Libano
1891

== Exhibitions ==
The first John Moores Contemporary Painting Prize exhibition was held in 1957. Sponsored by Sir John Moores, founder of Littlewoods, the competition has been held every two years ever since and is the biggest painting prize in the UK.

There is a regular programme of temporary exhibitions which in 2009–10 has included Aubrey Williams, Bridget Riley, Walter Sickert and Freud.

In 2004 the gallery staged The Stuckists Punk Victorian, the first national museum exhibition of the Stuckist art movement. The gallery also takes part in the Liverpool Biennial.

== See also ==
- Architecture of Liverpool
- Grade II* listed buildings in Liverpool – City Centre
- Liverpool Biennial
- The Stuckists Punk Victorian
