= Vanna =

Vanna (/ˈvænə/) is a given name that first appeared in recorded European history circa 1294. The Italian medieval feminine name originated in Tuscany, and is particular to Florence, Italy.

== History ==
The name Vanna first appears in print in La Vita Nuova, a 1294 book of verse written by Dante Alighieri, an Italian Florentine poet. In one verse, Dante writes that (anthropomorphized) Love itself proclaims that Vanna is Primavera ("Springtime") and declares that Beatrice's name is "Love".

Vanna is also a Cambodian unisex name (វណ្ណា Vaṇṇā [ʋannaː]) meaning "Gold". It originates from ancient Sanskrit Varṇa. Cambodian names are chosen for various themes such as Nature and positive attributes.

== Variations ==
Vannetta; Vanetta; Vannina; Vanni, similar to the first name Ivanna.

== Meanings and usage ==
The name Vanna is particular to the Tuscan province of Italy where usage originated during the Renaissance and became popular as a feminine first given name. Vanna is the feminine root form of Giovanni, the Italian cognate of John, meaning "God is gracious".

An Italian variant that closely resembles the name but was a family name and not in usage as a first or given name is the rare surname vanno, from ancient Latin meaning "she who sifts" (or "assesses") and "merit".

Vanna is a Cambodian given name to either females or males and means "golden" and "golden colored".

In Hebrew, Vanna means "God's gift".

The Russian and Czech variation Ivanna means "God is gracious".

Van is short for the Scottish variation Evan, meaning "Youth" and "God's grace".

The Italian Name day is July 23, in memory of the Blessed Vanna of Orvieto, who died in 1306.

== In popular culture ==
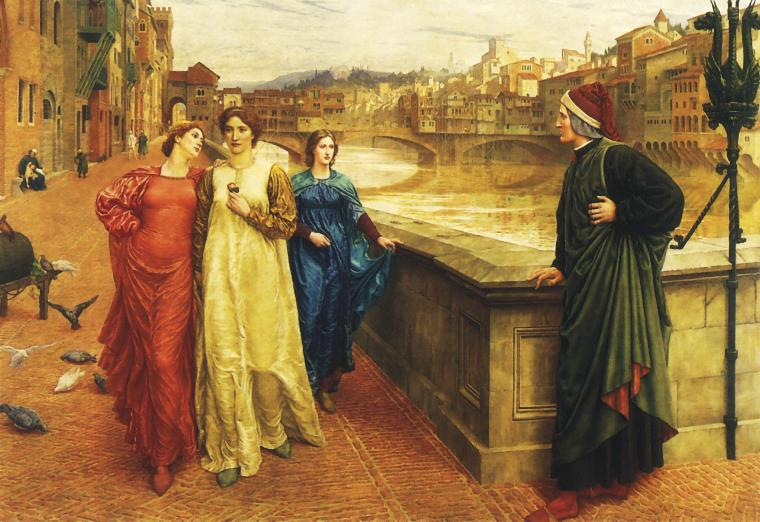
Dante and Beatrice, 1883 by English painter Henry Holiday, depicts Beatrice (white dress) with Vanna (red dress) walking along the Arno river as the enamored poet Dante Alighieri looks on.

=== Literature ===
- La Vita Nuova, by Dante Alighieri (1294). Vanna is a character inspired and named for a Florentine lady who was the best friend of Beatrice, his true love whom he later immortalizes in The Divine Comedy as the pure soul who awaits him at the gates of heaven.
- Poetry by Ezra Pound:
  - The Alchemist. In a chant for the transmutation of metals, Pound invokes: "Vanna, Mandetta, Viera, Alodetta, Picarda, Manuela / From the red gleam of copper, [...] O Queen of Cypress, / Out of Erebus, out of the flat waste of air, lying beneath the world; / Out of the brown leaf-brown colourless / Bring the imperceptible cool."
  - The Cantos. The last line of the Canto 93 describes ("un lume pien' di spiriti") "a light full of the spirits [of love]," and finishes with ("e Monna Vanna . . . tu mi fai rimembrar") "and Monna [Lady] Vanna, you cause me to remember [paradise]."

=== Theater, television, film ===
- Monna Vanna, by Maurice Maeterlinck (1902). The play was the first success in the writer's literary career that, in 1911, was honored with the Nobel Prize for literature. Ayn Rand referred to Monna Vanna "...one of the greatest plays in all of world literature". Monna Vanna played on every important stage in Europe, except in England, where it was prohibited by censors until 1914. The play was produced in Hollywood in 2007 by the Stella Adler theater, the first time since the 20th century.

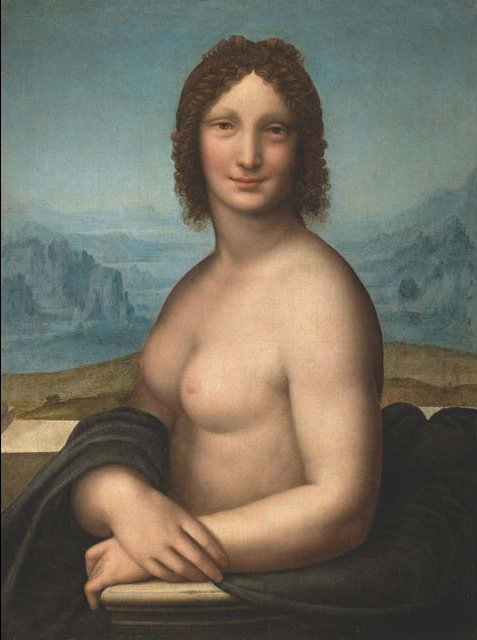
Monna Vanna - a nude version of the Mona Lisa painted by Salaì.

=== Painting ===
- Monna Vanna, by Dante Gabriel Rossetti (1866)
- Dante and Beatrice, by Henry Holiday (1883)
- Monna Vanna, a nude version of the Mona Lisa painted by Salaì (Gian Giacomo Caprotti da Oreno), a pupil of Leonardo da Vinci. (Monna was the Renaissance title for "Lady", e.g., Mona Lisa, Monna Vanna).

=== Music ===
- Monna Vanna, unfinished opera by Sergei Rachmaninoff
- Monna Vanna, opera in 4 acts by Henry Février
- Monna Vanna, opera in 3 acts by Emil Ábrányi
- Vanna, a post-hardcore band
- Vanna, a Croatian pop singer

== People ==
- Monna (Lady) Vanna, thirteenth century muse and love of Florentine poet Guido Cavalcanti
- Vanna Bonta (1953–2014), American novelist, poet and actress
- Vanna Brosio (1943–2010), Italian singer, television personality and journalist
- Vanna Rosenberg (born 1973), Swedish singer and actress
- Vanna Vanni (1920–1998), Italian film actress
- Vanna White (born 1957), American game show hostess

== See also ==
- Monna Vanna (disambiguation)
