= Dante and Beatrice =

Dante and Beatrice may refer to:

- Dante Alighieri and Beatrice Portinari
- Dante et Béatrice, an 1890 opera by Benjamin Godard to a libretto by Édouard Blau
- Dante and Beatrice from 1282 to 1290: A Romance, a work of historical fiction by Elizabeth Kerr Coulson
- Dante and Beatrice (painting), by Henry Holiday, 1883
- Dante and Beatrice, a painting by John William Waterhouse, 1915

== See also ==
- Dante's Dream (full title Dante's Dream at the Time of the Death of Beatrice), an 1871 painting by Dante Gabriel Rossetti
