= Folco Portinari =

Italian banker and the prior of Florence (died 1289)

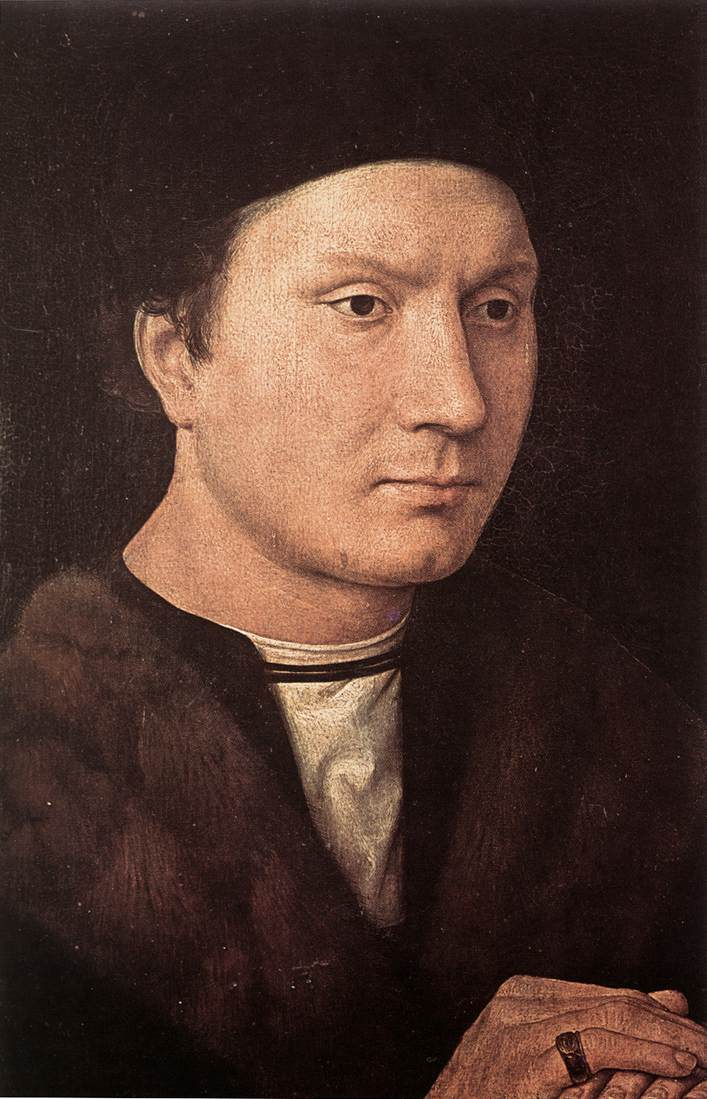
Portrait of Folco Portinari by Hans Memling, c. 1490

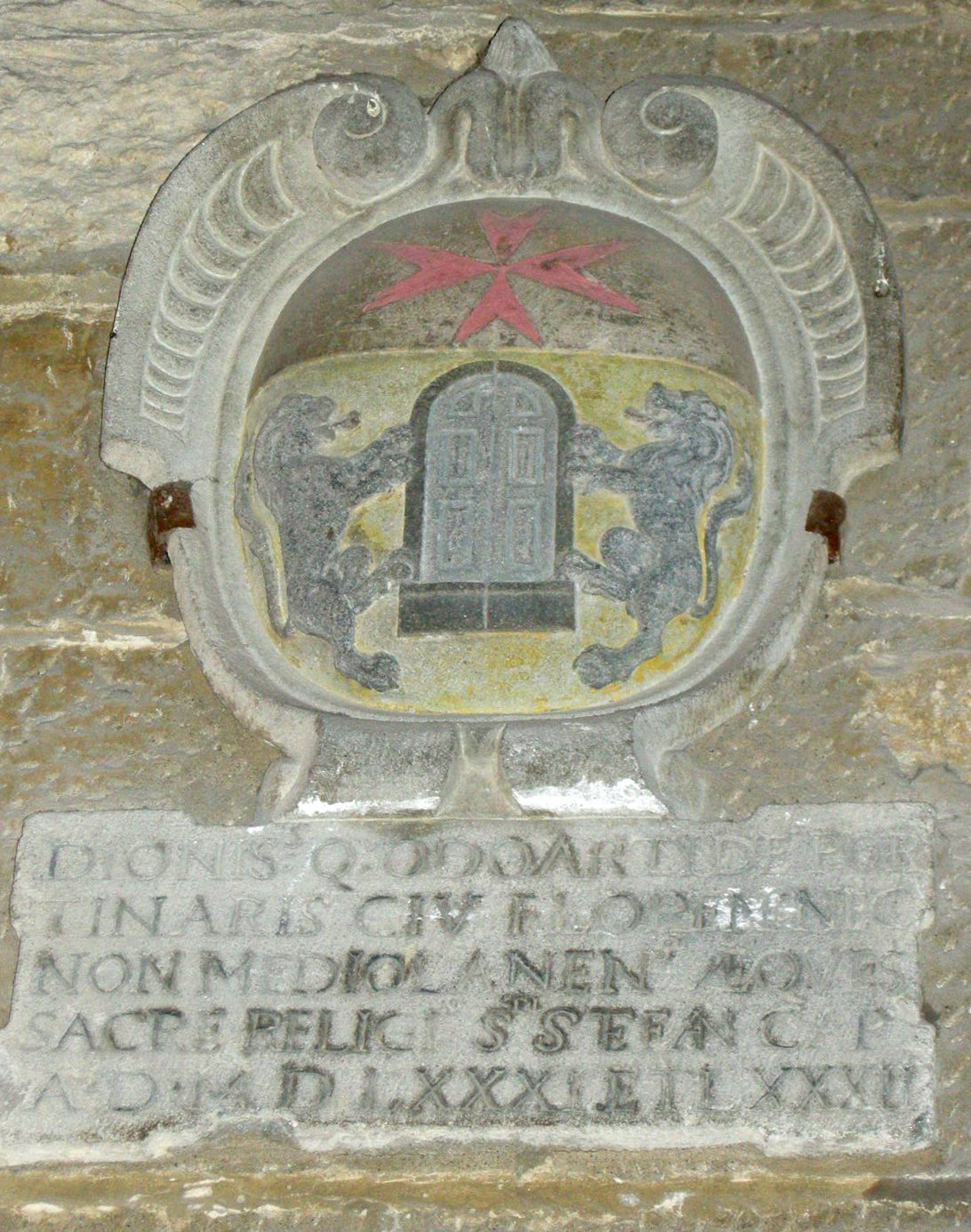
The Portinari coat of arms in the Palazzo dei Priori of Volterra.

Folco Portinari (died 31 December 1289) was an Italian banker and several times the prior of Florence. He was the father of Beatrice Portinari, the woman largely identified as the character loved by Dante Alighieri and mentioned in his works.

Portinari was born at Portico di Romagna, near Forlì. He donated a large part of his assets to found the Hospital of Santa Maria Nuova in Florence in 1288. His residence in Florence was the future Palazzo Portinari-Salviati. He was buried in the nearby church of Santa Margherita de' Cerchi.
