= Monna Vanna (disambiguation) =

Monna Vanna is an unfinished opera by Sergei Rachmaninoff.

Monna Vanna or Mona Vanna may also refer to:

- Monna Vanna, a play by Maurice Maeterlinck, the basis of Rachimaninoff's work and other operas:
  - Monna Vanna (Février), 1909
  - Monna Vanna, by Emil Ábrányi, 1907
- Monna Vanna (1915 film), an Italian silent film
- Monna Vanna (1916 film), a German-Hungarian silent film directed by Jenő Illés
- Monna Vanna (1922 film), a German silent film
- Monna Vanna (Rossetti), by Dante Gabriel Rossetti, 1866
- La Joconde nue, or Monna Vanna, a charcoal drawing by the school of Leonardo da Vinci
- Monna Vanna, a nude version of the Mona Lisa by Salaì (1480–1524)
- Mona Vanna, a painting by Joos van Cleve (c. 1485–1540)
- Monna Vanna, a character in La Vita Nuova, a 1294 text by Dante
- "Monna Vanna (Sweetheart Sublime)", a popular 1928 song by Phil Boutelje

== See also ==
- Vanna, a given name
