= Hospital of Santa Maria Nuova =

Medical facility in Florence, Italy

The Hospital of Santa Maria Nuova (Italian: Ospedale di Santa Maria Nuova) remains the oldest and most influential hospital in Florence, Italy. Founded in 1288, this hospital was built from humble origins to a highly efficient, flourishing, and organized medical system through formalized laws and ordinances. This medical system included an intricate hierarchy of medical personnel, a wide breadth of medical services, and free services to all Florence citizens and visitors. Today, the hospital is still functioning and serves as the oldest running hospital in the world, currently serving the needs of the increased population and modern medical advances.

== History ==
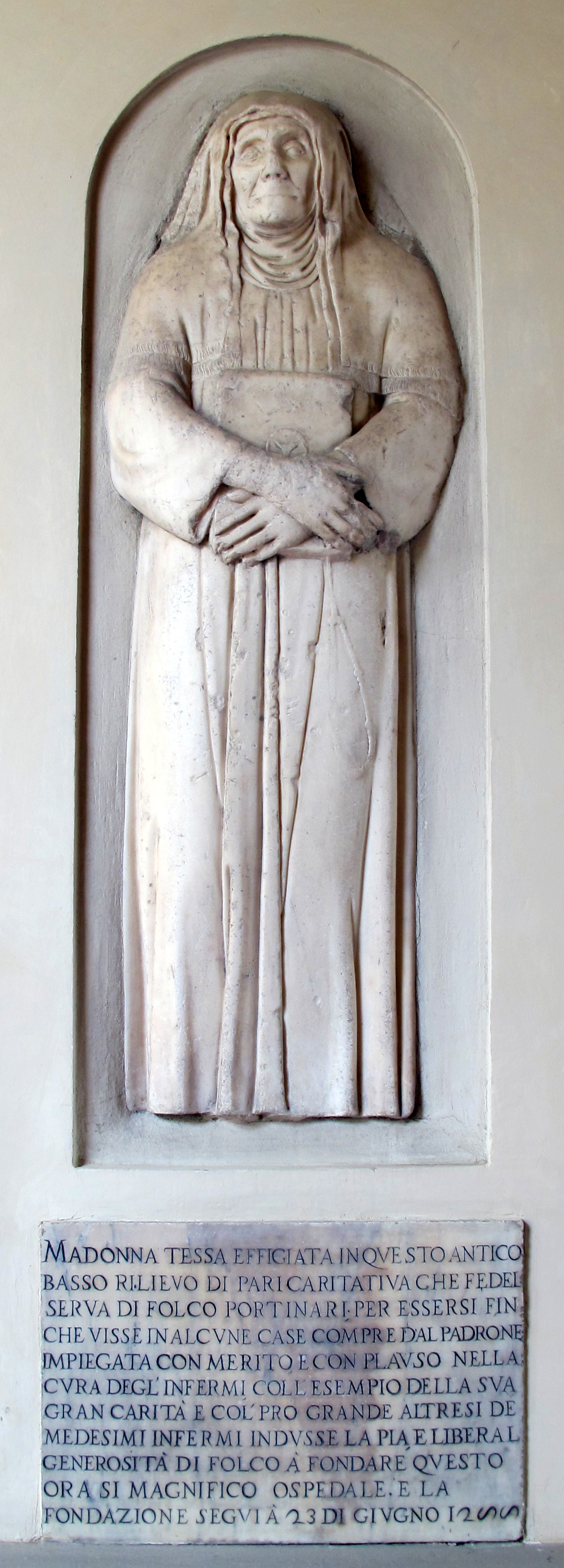
Statue of Monna Tessa at the entrance of the hospital

=== Origins ===
The Hospital of Santa Maria Nuova was founded in 1288 by a wealthy Florentine merchant, Folco de Ricovero Portinari (d.1289). His family's servant, Monna Tessa (d. 1327), heavily convinced Portinari to found the hospital with an emphasis of charity and humility. Her dedication to service and healing is remembered at her tombstone alongside Folco, located in the Cloister of the Bones, and by her marble statue at the entrance of the hospital. Folco's daughter, Beatrice (1265-1290), was the inspiration for Dante Alighieri's (1265-1321) Divine Comedy, though Beatrice and Dante were both married to other people and only met twice during their life.

After the hospital's foundation on the former convent of a Catholic community, Sant’Egidio, the hospital rapidly transformed financially and physically from small beginnings to a large medical system with more than two hundred beds, multiple wards, ranks of medical professionals, and multidisciplinary care, all made possible by public subsidies and generous donations of wealthy Florence citizens. The Hospital of Santa Maria Nuova was the first European medical institution to have a complex organization and still focus purely on healing the sick and the poor, regardless of financial status or place of origin.

== Organization of the Hospital ==
=== Rules, orders, and layouts ===
The Hospital of Santa Maria Nuova was particularly regarded for their progressive and modern rules, practices, and organizations. This hospital was an inspirational force throughout Europe; King Henry VII (1457-1509) of London requested two letters from Francesco Portinari, whose family founded the hospital, that described the ordinances and statues for the hospital that would help him later replicate their medical system in the Hospital of the Savoy. These ordinances included organization of staff, medical cures, and religious practices.

Santa Maria Nuova had an intricately structured hierarchy of medical personnel, beginning with the rector as the administrative and medical oversight, who was supported by core medical staff including physicians, residents, and surgeons, as well as nurses, pharmacists, and a treasurer that allowed for the continuous and specialized care. First, the hospital's head figure, or rector, was a respectable, religious figure and voted in by two thirds of a majority. His life was set by strict guidelines, as he oversaw all medical practices and organizational tasks of daily schedules and professional ranks. The rector also held the responsibility of looking after the women's ward from a respectable distance, only visiting them once a month for reassurance. Administrative employees also include the treasurer and notary, who had the large responsibility of recording annual income and expenditures in extreme detail including charcoal, linens, wine, fruit, veggies, poultry, and materials for the pharmacy including herbs, leeches, and lancets. The notary dealt with legal matters, such as wills, leases, and contracts regarding property of the dead.

The care of the sick in Santa Maria Nuova was also organized, with multiple layers of specialized care. The rector appointed the infirmarer, who was responsible for patient care and assisted by four deputies, each with seven nurses. Admission of the sick followed a strict procedure. If the ill couldn't arrive themselves, servants were sent to carry them to the hospital, an early version of medical transportation. When the patient was received, they were laid on a covered bed in the middle of the infirmary, where the infirmarer determined the nature of illness and the nurse washed the feet, emphasizing their focus on cleanliness. The patient was then assigned an admission number and a number to a bed, which was lined with linens, pillows, and additional covers depending on the season: wool for winter, linen for summer.

Next, the sub-informer oversaw the organization of the linens, and took in the patient by noting the patient's name, father's name, location of origin, family name, and amount of money. They also stripped the patient of their clothes and stored them in the Pergola, where the bags were organized alphabetically. Once assigned to a ward, patients were visited daily by three resident physicians, who report to six senior physicians. These senior doctors met each morning with the pharmacist, infirmarer, and one resident doctor to review each patient's illness and past treatments, where they were further prescribed more medication that was recorded by the pharmacist to prepare.

Diet was considered one of the best treatments and was specialized to each patient and illness. While chicken broth was the staple meal, different foods and wines were prescribed based on the humoral balance of the patient. The organization of food distribution ensured that food was delivered efficiently and cleaned afterward. During meal times, nurses went through each room to ensure the patient was eating, and noted if they needed assistance or failed to eat. Also, servants circulated the hospital three times per day and asked patients which sweet they would like.

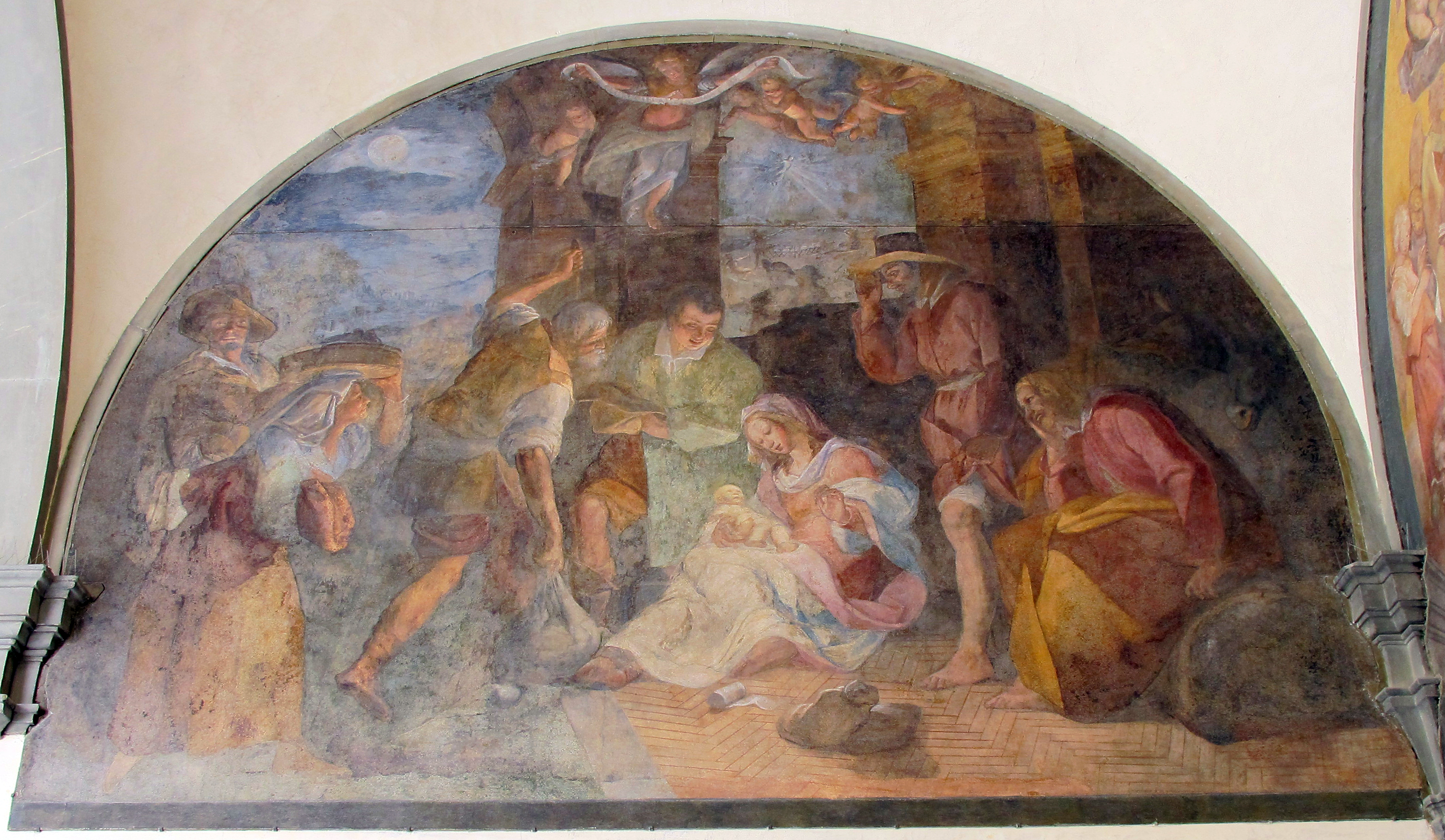
Fresco by Antonio Pomarancio in Santa Maria Nuova hospital, Adoration of the Shepherds 1614

Despite the emphasis of physical care, Santa Maria Nuova still emphasized religion into hospital life. All medical staff living in the hospital were required to take sacraments, attend confession, and take communion. A sacristan oversaw religious activities of the staff and patients. The patients received sacraments depending on their condition, and were organized on a public board into stages of confession, Eucharist, commendation of the soul to God, and extreme function for those near death. When patients were close to death, they were brought an image of Christ on the cross, with the nurses staying by the bedside reading holy texts. After death, the nurse prepared the body and clothed them to be placed near the middle of the hospital by the church. Once prepared, lay brothers would transport the body to a funeral service to be buried.

=== Physical organization of the hospital ===
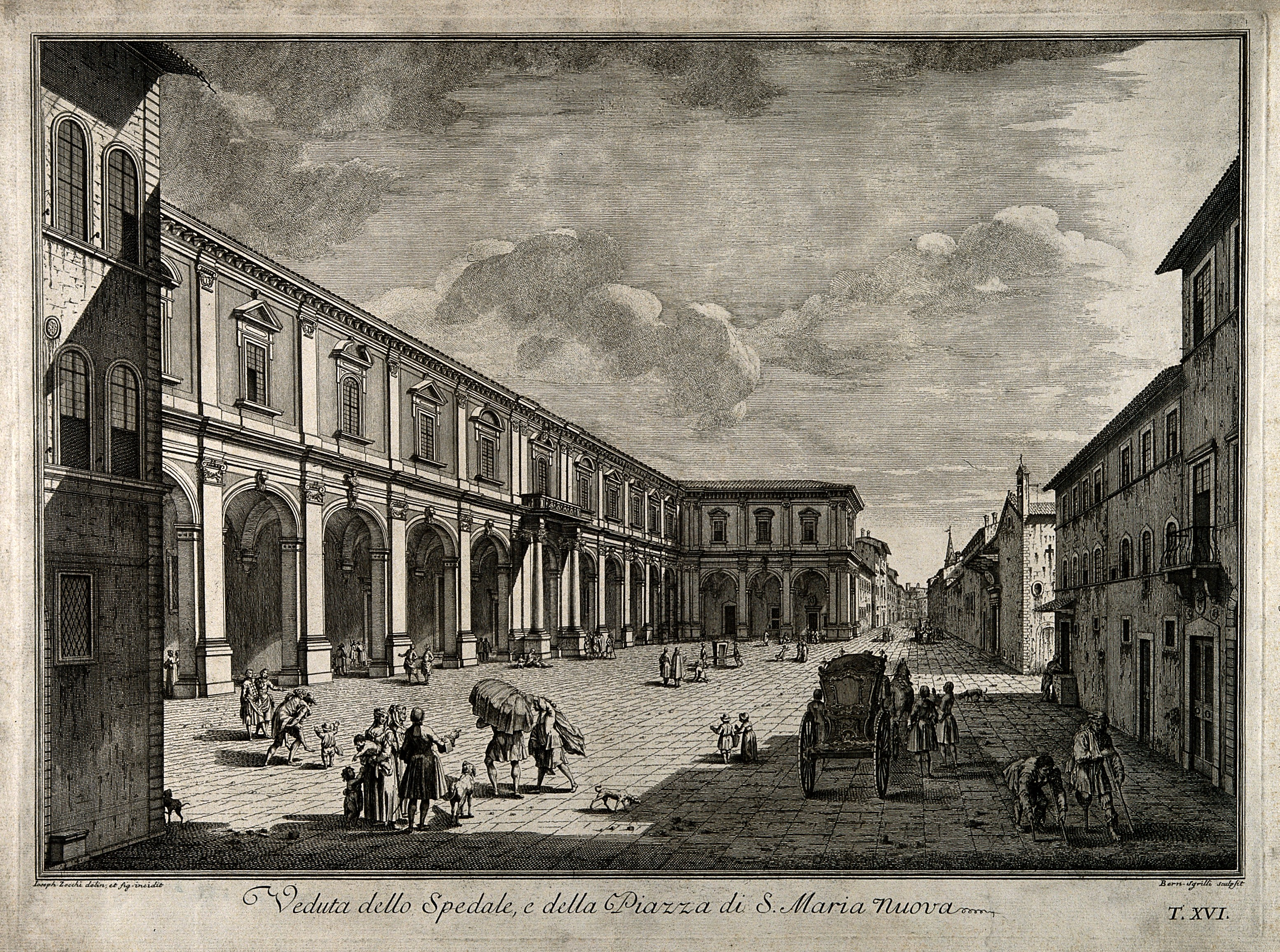
Hospital of Santa Maria Nuova, Florence, Italy. Drawing by B. Wellcome

The hospital has a clear physical organization that was conducive to the flow of medical personnel and extensive practices. The hospital was organized into multiple wards, including separate men and women's wards, the church of Sant’Egidio at the center, and supporting rooms surrounding the hospital such as the kitchen, pharmacy, and administrative rooms. The men's ward was the most developed department since it was founded first, growing to one hundred beds by the 1500s. The women's ward was separate from the men's, with an emphasis on having its own female nurses and medical staff. The hospital's church of Sant’Egidio served as the center for patient healing, symbolizing healing as a physical and spiritual process. The medicinarium was a separate clinical space that was not only used for surgery, but also outpatient care and minor treatments for those who could not afford in-home care. Additionally, the pharmacy was a separate room with twenty two vessels for distilling and an intricate system for preparing medications and storing ingredients. The pharmacy was dependent on the garden founded in the 15th century, since it provided all of the plants used in medicines and distillery. The kitchen was also a key aspect of the hospital, as they were known for using specialized diets as a part of treatment, especially chicken soup. The hospital also included living quarters for lay brothers and medical staff that had strict guidelines for who can enter and visit. Courtyards and open spaces served as treatment since “bad air” was believed to be unhealthy and associated with illness.

Presently, the Hospital of Santa Maria Nuova is still functioning, making it the oldest continuously operating hospital in the world. While the structure and physical architecture is preserved, the facility has changed to meet modern medical standards. Some department and hospital services offered today include emergency medicine, general surgery, dermatology, psychiatry, radiology, and neurology.

=== Medical practice ===
The Hospital of Santa Maria Nuova followed the principles of Galenic humoral balance and medicinal alchemy, which were the dominant medical theories and practices during the foundation of the hospital. Later in the 16th century, physicians of this hospital compiled hundreds of traditional procedures as well as complex, novel recipes and practices into a notebook. The depth and specialization of medical knowledge allowed the hospital to deal with common medical practices such as minor surgery, enemas, compresses and more complex procedures ranging from hernias, skull fractures, dysmenorrhoea, and insomnia. The hospital also began innovative specialties including mental illness and female specific conditions. In 1688, an institution for poor and mentally ill men was opened in a nearby hospital, with women later being accepted in 1712. All mentally ill patients were moved to the main hospital in 1780 once the hospital formalized specialized departments. All medical practices including traditional and experimental procedures were created with the goal of balancing food and drink, air, exercise, sleep, and the regulation of emotions.

== Art and Architecture: The Institution ==
=== 15th Century ===
In the fifteenth century, the hospital enjoyed remarkable economic prosperity and even received a visit from Pope Martin V (1369-1431) in 1419. In 1420 the addition of the cloister of the medical center by Bicci di Lorenzo (1373-1452) marked a major transformation and expansion of the original building. The addition still has a terracotta lunette depicting the Pietà by Giovanni della Robbia (1469-1529) and clay sculpture with the Madonna with Child (18 BC- 33AD) and two angels, attributed to Michelozzo (1396-1472). In the early decades of the fifteenth century the aisles were decorated by Niccolò di Pietro Gerini (1340-1414) with frescoes that are now partially preserved in the original locations and some were detached and placed in the living room of Pope Martin V where they now have the office of the hospital president. In the Cloister of the Bones was a detached fresco representing Last Judgment by Fra Bartolomeo (1472-1517), now at San Marco Museum.

=== 16th century ===
Further works were done in the late sixteenth century by important artists:

- Giambologna made stuccos in a lane of the men's ward
- Alessandro Allori (1535-1607) painted frescoes in the men's ward chapel
- Bernardo Buontalenti (1531-1608) painted frescoes in the walls and ceiling of the women's ward

These works have been moved to the Pinacoteca of the Spedale degli Innocenti. Bernardo Buontalenti designed the large porch that is the main entrance to the hospital and regrettably did not live long enough to see its implementation. Construction of the porch was begun in 1611 by Giulio Parigi (1571-1635) and finally brought to completion in 1960. Later in the 1660s, the old lanes of the women's ward were replaced by Giovanni Battista Pieratti with a new more spacious environment.

=== Pope Martin V Administrative Hall ===
In the administrative hall (room and lounge of the hospital president), which are accessed by a staircase in the Cloister of Bones, there are frescos and other works from the facade of the Church of Sant'Egidio and from other monasteries. The works in this hall are/have been:

- "The Crucifixion with Saints Romuald and John the Baptist" by Andrea del Castagno (1440-1444), now in the cloister of the Church of Santa Maria degli Angeli.
- "The Coronation of the Virgin", a terracotta sculpture attributed to Dello Delli, now in the portal of the Church of Sant'Egidio (which has been replaced by a cast).
- "Consecration of the new church of Sant'Egidio by Pope Martin V", a sinopia by Lorenzo di Bicci removed from the facade of the Church of Sant'Egidio.
- "Pope Martin V confirming the privileges of the hospital", a detached fresco originally performed circa 1473 by Gherardo di Giovanni and said to have been repainted in 1560 by Francesco Brina, from the facade of the Church of Sant'Egidio.

=== Cloister of Bones ===
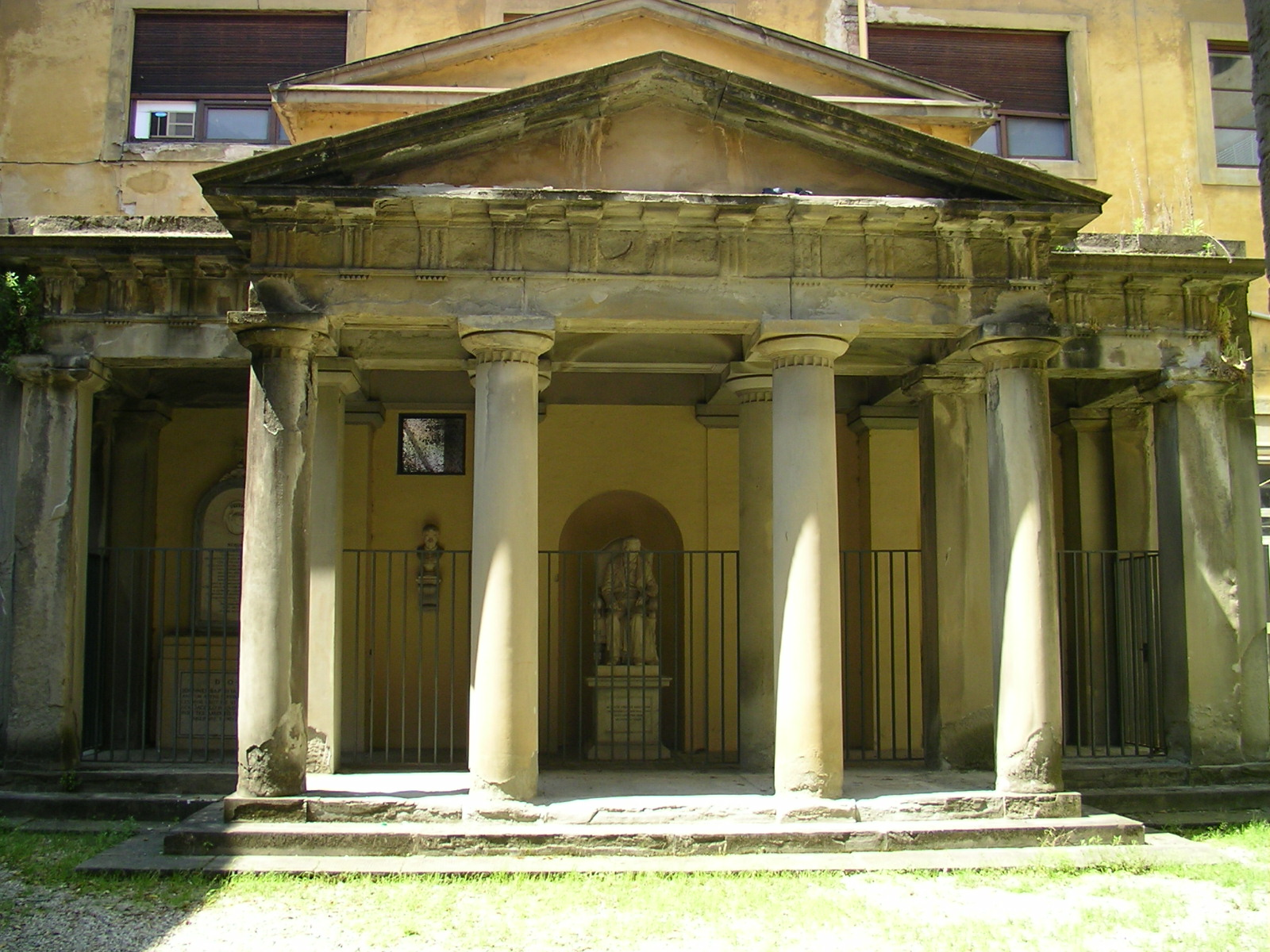
Entrance to the Cloister of Bones

The Cloister of Bones, a temple and formerly a burial site, was built in the nineteenth century by Costoli in pietra serena. The temple has columns and pillars and in the center is the statue of the Marquis Angiolo Galli Tassi. The statue has the inscription in the back: "From the benefactor to the beneficiaries - Year 1863". On the front the statue has the following inscription: "Count Angiolo Galli - that emulates the love of the ancients - the ancestral heritage linked - to hospitals in Tuscany". There is also an inscription with the sculpture of Monna Tessa, the inspiration of the legendary Folco Portinari, from the church of Santa Margherita de' Cerchi.

== Departments and hospital services ==
- Emergency department
- Clinical Observation
- General Surgery
- Dermatology
- Medicine
- Psychiatry
- Intensive Care
- U.T.I.C.
- Day hospital doctor
- Day hospital oncology
- Radiology
- Laboratory analysis
- Neurology
- Endoscopy
- Dermatological Allergy
- Sexually Transmitted Diseases

== Famous interns ==
- Leonardo da Vinci, Circa 1507-1508
- Paolo Mascagni, 1801
- François Carlo Antommarchi, 1809
- Sarah Parker Remond, 1866-1868
