= 83 Beatrix =

Main-belt asteroid

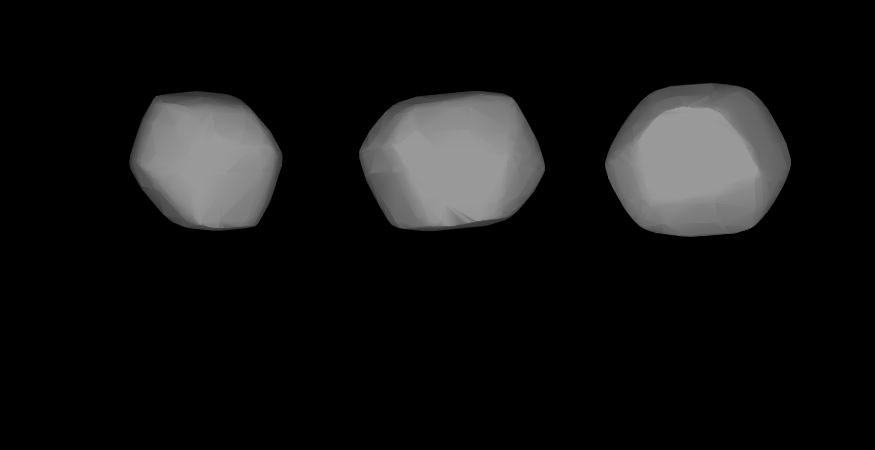
- A three-dimensional model of 83 Beatrix based on its lightcurve

Discovery
- Discovered by: Annibale de Gasparis
- Discovery date: 26 April 1865

Designations
- Pronunciation: /ˈbiːətrɪks/ BEE-ə-triks
- Named after: Beatrice Portinari
- Minor planet category: Main belt
- Adjectives: Beatrician (/ˌbiːəˈtrɪʃən/ BEE-ə-TRISH-ən)

Orbital characteristics
- Epoch 9 June 2026 (JD 2461200.5)
- Uncertainty parameter 0
- Aphelion: 2.6335 AU
- Perihelion: 2.2289 AU
- Semi-major axis: 2.4312 AU
- Eccentricity: 0.0832
- Orbital period (sidereal): 1384.64 d (3.7909 yr)
- Average orbital speed: 19.07 km/s
- Mean anomaly: 183.987°
- Inclination: 4.9671°
- Longitude of ascending node: 27.6549°
- Argument of perihelion: 169.864°
- T_{Jupiter}: 3.497

Physical characteristics
- Dimensions: 81.4 km
- Mass: (7.2±1.0)×10^{17} kg (Note: Calculated from its standard gravitational parameter GM = 0.048±0.007 km^{3}/s^{2}.)
- Mean density: 1.03 g/cm^{3} (Note: Assuming a diameter of 111 km.)
- Synodic rotation period: 10.11 hours
- Geometric albedo: 0.092
- Spectral type: X
- Absolute magnitude (H): 8.66

83 Beatrix is a fairly large asteroid orbiting in the inner part of the main asteroid belt. It was discovered by Annibale de Gasparis on 26 April 1865. It was his last asteroid discovery. A diameter of at least 68 kilometres (42 mi) was determined from the Beatrician stellar occultation observed on 15 June 1983. It is named for Beatrice Portinari, beloved of Dante Alighieri and immortalized by him in La Vita Nuova and The Divine Comedy.

On 16 February 2001, an occultation of a magnitude +9.09 star by this asteroid was observed from three locations. The resulting chords matched an elliptical profile with a mean radius of 35.9 km. The observers noted some dimming and flickering at the beginning of the event, which may indicate the star was binary or the asteroid has an irregular shape. Previous occultations had been observed in 1983 and 1990, which produced a much larger size estimate of 81.4 km.

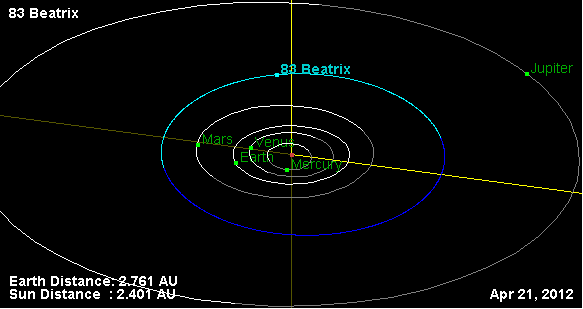
Beatrician orbit
