= La Joconde nue =

Drawing by the school of Leonardo da Vinci

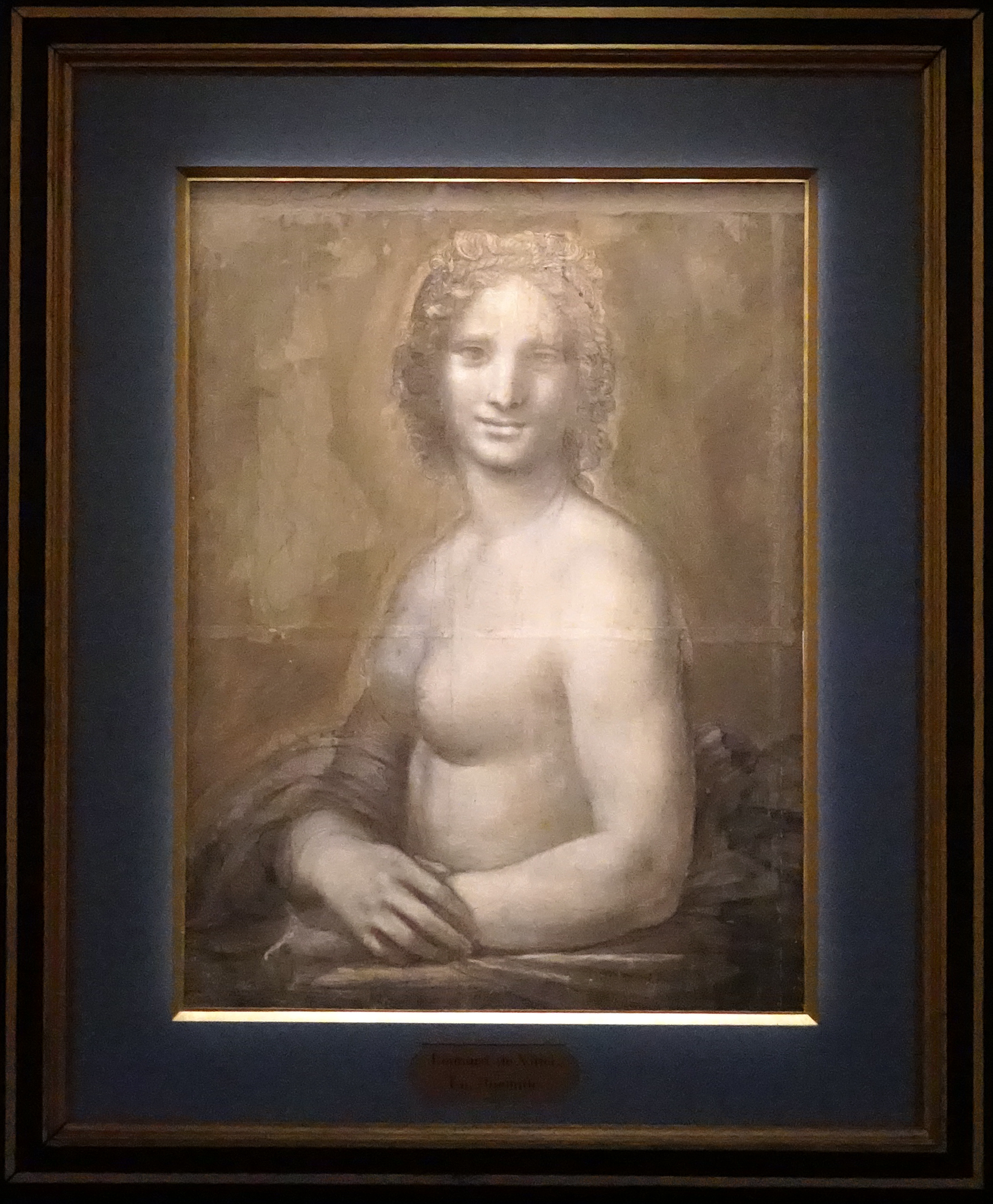
La Joconde nue, in the Condé Museum, Chantilly

La Joconde nue or Monna Vanna is a 1514–1516 charcoal drawing with white highlights by the school of Leonardo da Vinci. It is a semi-nude portrait of a woman, 28-by-21 inch in size. The position of the subject's hands and body are almost identical to that of Leonardo's Mona Lisa, leading some experts to suggest this work may be a preparatory drawing for the famous painting. These experts identify this as an exceptionally fine work by a left-handed master, leading to speculation that it is the work of Leonardo himself. The work has been held by the Condé Museum in Chantilly, France, since 1862.

About twenty similar paintings of "nude Mona Lisas" are known; a famous one from da Vinci's school is the Donna nuda at the Hermitage in Saint Petersburg.

== See also ==
- Monna Vanna (disambiguation)
- Salaì
- Speculations about Mona Lisa
