= Elizabeth Kerr Coulson =

English novelist

Elizabeth Kerr Coulson (c. 1819 – 23 January 1876) was an English novelist who published under the pseudonym Roxburghe Lothian. Her two-volume work of historical fiction, Dante and Beatrice from 1282 to 1290: A Romance, was published only three weeks before her death. Her fictionalized autobiography Lizzie Lothian appeared posthumously.

She died at Bellaport Old Hall, near the village of Norton in Hales in Shropshire.

== Dante and Beatrice ==
Her two-volume work of historical fiction, Dante and Beatrice from 1282 to 1290: A Romance (based on the lives of Dante Alighieri and Beatrice Portinari), was published only three weeks before her death. Reviews were mixed; The Edinburgh Review noted that the author, assumed to be a man, showed "keen appreciation of the social aspects of Florentine life at this period, with its vivid contrasts of light and shade." Lothian's "gifts of deep feeling and sympathetic fancy" combined with "careful antiquarian study" were praised, though it was admitted that the characters are "somewhat fantastical."

The British Quarterly Review likewise acknowledged the book's antiquarian value as a "handbook" of the period's "manners, customs, literature, laws, religion, architecture." The biographical facts pertaining to Dante and Beatrice's lives, however, are handled with fictional licence, sometimes to the point of contradiction. The author is praised for "his" learning, productive effort, and descriptive powers, but the anonymous reviewer concludes that "dramatic imagination is altogether wanting" and "the book is a museum rather than a stage."

== Sources ==
- Susan Brown, Patricia Clements, Isobel Grundy. "Women's Writing in the British Isles from the Beginnings to the Present".The Orlando Project.
