= Cambodian name =

Cambodian names (or Khmer names; Khmer: ឈ្មោះខ្មែរ, romanized: chhmŏăh khmêr) are names used or originating in Cambodia which usually consist of two elements including a patronymic, which serves as a common family name for siblings, followed by a given name (i.e. following the Eastern name order). An example is singer Sinn Sisamouth, his surname (last name) is Sinn and his given name (first name) is Sisamouth (in Western sources, the two are sometimes reversed).

The use of surnames in Cambodia is relatively recent and was not mandated by law until imposed by the French in 1910. Surnames are typically derived from the father's given name.

Other Austroasiatic indigenous people groups within Cambodia have similar naming customs, while the Sino-Khmer and Viet-Khmer may follow Chinese and Vietnamese naming patterns, respectively. Chams in Cambodia may have either Khmer or Cham names or a combination of both. Cham name order is the reverse of the Khmer; the given name is followed by the father's given name.

== Given names ==
Generally, women are given names relating to beauty, while men are given names of virtues. Some Khmer given names are unisex names.

== Surnames ==
Historically, Khmer practiced cognatic kinship and reckoned descent bilaterally, and surnames were not used to trace descent. Surnames became mandatory only by legal decree during the French colonial era in 1910, but was rarely used outside of legal and administrative matters. After the passage of the law, parents often gave their children the father, grandfather or great-grandfather's given name as a surname. Some Khmer may also have surnames from the mother or two given names with one used as a surname. This heterogeneous naming practice continued into the 1970s and 1980s. When they were used, they were usually taken from the father's given name and are generally monosyllabic. Khmer surnames are sometimes identical to Chinese or Vietnamese surnames. Women do not adopt their husbands' surnames.

== Origin and meanings ==
The earliest attested names among Khmer either have indigenous origins or were drawn from Sanskrit. The use of Sanskrit and Indic words as names continues to the present.

The meanings of Khmer names are generally very simple and reference positive attributes. Cambodian people are called by their given names without a title (informal) or by their given names with a title (formal); the full name, including both family name and given name is often used (Surnames are used as a form of address, however, in the case of names that originated as revolutionary aliases).

Different naming traditions exist among ethnic groups other than the Khmer majority. The Cambodian population is 90% Buddhist and names are often taken from Buddhism. Among the Muslim minority, Arabic names are often used as family names.

== Pronunciation ==
Khmer names are usually pronounced with the stress (emphasis) placed on the last syllable. Khmer uses a glottal stop (the brief stop in uh-oh) and other stops: p, t, c and k which may or may not occur with aspiration. In romanizations of Khmer script, aspiration (i.e., a breath sound) is usually marked with an h. Final r, d, g, s, b, and z sounds are not heard: Ngor is pronounced Ngow. Some final consonants are written but not pronounced.

== List of some family names ==
Although historically, surnames were chosen from the father, grandfather, or great-grandfather's given name, in modern practice, surnames are now usually transmitted from father to children. Other ethnic groups, particularly Chinese-Cambodians and Vietnamese-Cambodians, may have a family name that is taken by each generation, in which case the name is pronounced similarly to the language of origin but within the bounds of Khmer phonology. Below is a list of some common family names, some of which are also found as given names.

Khmer	IPA	UNGEGN	Common spellings
កូយ	/kouj/	Koy	Koy
កឹម	/kəm/	Kœ̆m	Koem
កែប	/kaep/	Kêb	Kaep, Kep
កែវ	/kaew/	Kêv	Kev, Kaev, Keo
កាំង	/kaŋ/	Kăng	Kang
ខាត់	/kʰat/	Khăt	Khat
ខាយ	/kʰaːj/	Khay	Khay
ខៀវ	/kʰiəw/	Khiĕv	Khiev, Kheav
ខ្លូត	/kʰlout/	Khlot	Khlot
គ្រី	/kriː/	Kri	Kri, Kry, Kree
គឹម	/kɨm/	Kœ̆m	Koem, Kim
គួច	/kuəc/	Kuŏch	Kuoch
ឃាង	/kʰiəŋ/	Khéang	Kheang
ឃិន	/kʰɨn/	Khĭn	Khin
ឃីម	/kʰiːm/	Khim	Khim
ចន្ទ	/can/	Chăn	Chan
ចាន់	/can/	Chăn	Chan
ចាប	/caːp/	Chab	Chap
ចេង	/ceːŋ/	Chéng	Cheng
ចេន	/ceːn/	Chén	Chen, Jen
ឆន	/cʰɑːn/	Chhân	Chhan, Chhorn
ឆាយ	/cʰaːj/	Chhay	Chhay
ជា	/ciə/	Chéa	Chea
ជាម	/ciəm/	Chéam	Cheam
ជិន	/cɨn/	Chĭn	Chin, Jin
ជី	/ciː/	Chi	Chi, Chy
ជឹម	/cɨm/	Chœ̆m	Choem
ជ័យ	/cɨj/	Chey	Chey, Jey
ឈិត	/cʰɨt/	Chhĭt	Chhit
ឈិន	/cʰɨn/	Chhĭn	Chhin
ឈឹម	/cʰɨm/	Chhœ̆m	Chhoem
ញឹក	/ɲɨk/	Nhœ̆k	Nhoek
ដួង	/ɗuəŋ/	Duŏng	Duong
ឌិត	/ɗɨt/	Dĭt	Dit, Dith
ឌិន	/ɗɨn/	Dĭn	Din
ឌី	/ɗiː/	Di	Di, Dy, Dee
ឌុល	/ɗul/	Dŭl	Dul
ឌួង	/ɗuəŋ/	Duŏng	Duong
តក់	/tɑk/	Ták	Tak
តាង	/taːŋ/	Tang	Tang
តាត	/taːt/	Tat	Tat, Tath
តូច	/touc/	Toch	Toch, Touch
តាំង	/taŋ/	Tăng	Tang
ថន	/tʰɑːn/	Thân	Than, Thorn
ថៃ	/tʰaj/	Thai	Thai
ទាវ	/tiəw/	Téav	Teav
ទី	/tiː/	Ti	Ti, Ty, Tee
ទុំ	/tum/	Tŭm	Tum
ទ្រី	/triː/	Tri	Tri, Try
ទេព	/teːp/	Tép	Tep
ធី	/tʰiː/	Thi	Thi, Thy,
នី	/niː/	Ni	Ni, Ny,
ប្រាក់	/prak/	Prăk	Prak
ប៉ាង	/paːŋ/	Pang	Pang
ប៉ុក	/pok/	Pŏk	Pok
ប៊ុន	/bun/	Bŭn	Bun
ប៉ែន	/paen/	Pên	Pen, Paen
ផាន	/pʰaːn/	Phan	Phan
ពិជ	/pɨc/	Pĭch	Pich
ពេជ្រ	/peːc/	Péch	Pech
ភី	/pʰiː/	Phi	Phi, Phy
មា	/maː/	Ma	Ma
មាន	/miən/	Méan	Mean
មាស	/miəh/	Méas	Meas
មួយ	/muəj/	Muŏy	Muoy
មូល	/muːl/	Mul	Mul, Moul
មេង	/meːŋ/	Méng	Meng
ម៉ៅ	/maw/	Mau	Mau, Mao
យស់	/yuh/	Yós	Yos, Yoh
យុន	/yun/	Yŭn	Yun
យូ	/yuː/	Yu	Yu, You
រស់	/rʊəh/	Ruŏs	Ruos, Ruoh, Ros
រួយ	/rʊəj/	Ruŏy	Ruoy
លន់	/lun/	Lón	Lon
លិម	/lim/	Lĭm	Lim, Lym
លី	/liː/	Li	Li, Ly, Lee
លីវ	/liːw/	Liv	Liv
លីម	/liːm/	Lim	Lim
វ៉ាង	/ʋaːŋ/	Vang	Vang
វង្ស	/ʋuŋ/	Vóng	Vong
ស	/sɑː/	Sâ	Sa, Sar, Sor
សង	/sɑːŋ/	Sâng	Sang, Song
សន	/sɑːn/	Sân	San, Sorn
ស៊ន	/sɔːn/	Sôn	Son, Sorn
សម	/sɑm/	Sám	Sam, Som
សរ	/sɑːØ/	Sâ	Sa, Sar, Sor
សាង	/saːŋ/	Sang	Sang
សាត	/saːt/	Sat	Sat, Sath
សាន	/saːn/	San	San
សាន់	/san/	Săn	San
សាយ	/saːj/	Say	Say
សិន	/sən/	Sĕn	Sen, Sin
សឺន	/səɨn/	Sœn	Soen, Seun, Son
សុខ	/sok/	Sŏk	Sok
សុង	/soŋ/	Sŏng	Song
សុន	/son/	Sŏn	Son
ស៊ុន	/sun/	Sŭn	Sun
ស៊ុយ	/suj/	Sŭy	Suy
សូ	/soː/	So	So
ស៊ូ	/suː/	Su	Su
សួន	/suən/	Suŏn	Suon
សឿង	/sɨəŋ/	Sœăng	Soeang
សៀង	/siəŋ/	Siĕng	Sieng, Seang
សេង	/seːŋ/	Séng	Seng
សេន	seːn	Sén	Sen
សោម	/saom/	Saôm	Saom, Som
សៅ	/saw/	Sau	Sau, Sao
ហាក់	/hak/	Hăk	Hak
ហុង	/hoŋ/	Hŏng	Hong
ហ៊ុន	/hun/	Hŭn	Hun
ហូ	/hou/	Ho	Ho
ហេង	/heːŋ/	Héng	Heng
ឡាយ	/laːj/	Lay	Lay
ឡុង	/loŋ/	Lŏng	Long
អាង	/ʔaːŋ/	Ang	Ang
អិម	/ʔim/	Ĕm	Em, Im, Yim
អុង	/ʔoŋ/	Ŏng	Ong
អ៊ុច	/ʔuc/	Ŭch	Uch
អ៊ុយ	/ʔuj/	Ŭy	Uy
អៀម	/ʔiəm/	Iĕm	Iem, Eam, Iam
អៀវ	/ʔiew/	Iĕv	Iev, Eav, Eaw
អ៊ុំ	/ʔum/	Ŭm	Um
ឯក	/ʔaek/	Êk	Ek, Aek
ឱ	/ʔaːo/	Aô	Ao, Or
ឱក	/ʔaːok/	Aô	Aok
ឱម	/ʔaːom/	Aôm	Aom, Om

== List of given names ==
Unlike Khmer family names, given names may have multiple syllables and differ greatly. Given names were influenced greatly by Sanskrit.

Khmer	IPA	BGN/PCGN	Geographic Department	ALA-LC	Common spellings
បទុម	[ɓɔtom]	Bâtŭm	Batum	Padum	Botum
ចន្ថា	[cɑntʰaː]	Chântha	Chantha	Canthā	Chantha
ជា	[ciə]	Chéa	Chea	Jā	Chea
ជាតា	[ciətaː]	Chéata	Cheata	Jātā	Cheata
ឆេង	[cʰeːŋ]	Chhéng	Chheng	Cheng	Chheng
ឈៀង	[cʰiəŋ]	Chhiĕng	Chhieng	Chiang	Chhieng, Chheang
តា	[taː]	Ta	Ta	Tā	Ta
តារា	[taːraː]	Tara	Tara	Tārā	Tara, Dara
ឡេង	[leːŋ]	Léng	Leng	Ḷeng	Leng
ណារ៉ុង	[naːroŋ]	Narŏng	Narong	Ṇār"ung	Narong
និមល	[nimɔl]	Nĭmôl	Nimol	Nimal	Nimol
ភួង	[pʰuəŋ]	Phuŏng	Phuong	Bhuang	Phuong
សារឿន	[saːrɨən]	Sarœăn	Saroean	Sārẏan	Saroeun
ស្រី	[srəj]	Srei	Srei	Srī	Srey, Srei
សន	[sɑːn]	Sân	San	San	Sorn, Son, San
បុប្ផា	[ɓopʰaː]	Bŏbpha	Bobpha	Pupphā	Bopha
បុរី	[ɓorəj]	Bŏri	Bori	Purī	Borey, Borei
ចិន្ដា	[cənɗaː]	Chĕnda	Chenda	Cenṭā	Chenda
ឈួន	[cʰuən]	Chhuŏn	Chhuon	Jhuan	Chhuon
ខាន់	[kʰan]	Khăn	Khan	Khân	Khan
កុសល	[kosɑl]	Kŏsál	Kosal	Kusal	Kosal
គុន្ធា	[kuntʰiə]	Kŭnthéa	Kunthea	Gunṭhā	Kunthea
ឡាយ	[laːj]	Lay	Lay	Ḷāy	Lay
លំអង	[lom.ʔɑŋ]	Lum'âng	Lum'ang	Laṃ'ang	Lom Ang, Lom Ong
ម៉ាលី	[maːliː]	Mali	Mali	M"ālī	Mali, Maly
ម៉ី	[məj]	Mei	Mei	M"ī	Mey, Mei
ណារី	[naːriː]	Nari	Nari	Ṇārī	Nary, Nari
បញ្ញា	[paɲaː]	Bânhnhéa	Banhnhea	Paññā	Panha, Pagna
ពិសិដ្ឋ	[pisɨt]	Pĭsĕdth	Pisedth	Bisiṭṭh	Piseth
ផល្លា	[pʰɑllaː]	Phâlléa	Phallea	Phallā	Phalla
ភារៈ	[pʰiəreaʔ]	Phéareă	Pheareak	Bhārà	Pheareak, Phireak
ភិរុណ	[pʰiron]	Phĭrŭn	Phirun	Bhiruṇ	Phirun
ពៅ	[pɨw]	Pŏu	Pov	Bau	Pov
រស្មី	[reasməj]	Rôsmei	Rosmei	Rasmī	Rasmey, Raksmey, Reaksmey
រិទ្ធិ	[rɨt]	Rĭtthĭ	Ritthi	Riddhi	Rith, Rit
រី	[riː]	Ri	Ri	Rī	Ry, Ri
សម្បត្តិ	[sɑmˈɓat]	Sâmbâttĕ	Sambatte	Sampatti	Sambath
សម្ផស្ស	[sɑmˈpʰɔəh]	Sâmphâss	Samphass	Samphass	Samphors, Somphors
សំណាង	[sɑmˈnaːŋ]	Sâmnang	Samnang	Saṃṇāng	Samnang, Somnang
សារិទ្ធ	[saːrɨt]	Sarĭtth	Saritth	Sāriddh	Sarith, Sarit
សុខា	[sokʰaː]	Sŏkha	Sokha	Sukhā	Sokha
សុធា	[sotʰiə]	Sŏthéa	Sothea	Sudhā	Sothea
សុផល	[sopʰɑl]	Sŏphâl	Sophal	Suphal	Sophal
សុផាត	[sopʰɑt]	Sŏphat	Sophat	Suphat	Sophat
សុភា	[sopʰiə]	Sŏphéa	Sophea	Subhā	Sophea
សុភាព	[sopʰiəp]	Sŏphéap	Sopheap	Subhāb	Sopheap
សួន	[suən]	Suŏn	Suon	Suan	Suon
ទី	[tiː]	Ti	Ti	Dī	Ti, Ty
វណ្ណា	[ʋanaː]	Vônna	Vonna	Vaṇṇā	Vanna
វាសនា	[ʋiəsnaː]	Véasânéa	Veasanea	Vāsanā	Veasna
វិបុល	[ʋibol]	Vĭbŏl	Vibol	Vipul	Vibol
វុឌ្ឍី, វុទ្ធី	[ʋutʰiː]	Vŭdthi	Vudthi	Vuḍḍhī	Vuthy

== Compound names ==
At times, many families combine shorter names to create a longer name. This happens often among the wealthier class of Cambodians.

- Sovanna (Combined "So" and "Vanna") means gold in Sanskrit
- Somally (Combined "So" and "Maly")
- Chandarith (Combined "Chanda" and "Rith")
