= St Benedict's Church, Bordesley =

Coordinates: 52.4745°N 1.8405°W

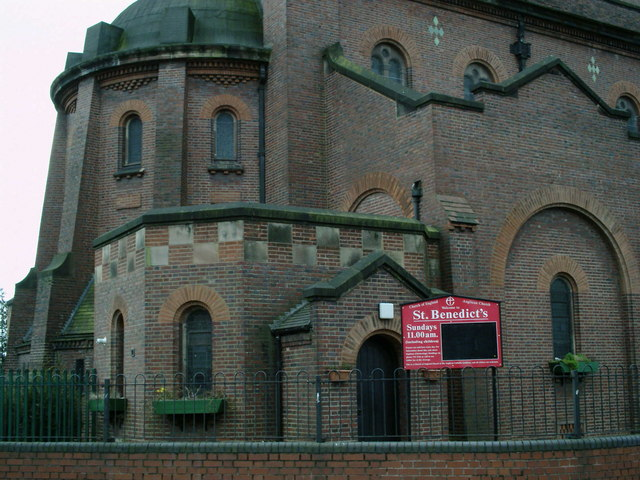
- Apsidal east end of St Benedict's church, seen from the north

- Location in the West Midlands
- OS grid reference: SP 10932 86298
- Location: Birmingham
- Country: England
- Denomination: Church of England

History
- Dedication: St Benedict of Nursia

Architecture
- Heritage designation: Grade II listed
- Designated: 8 July 1982
- Architect(s): Nicol and Nicol
- Style: Byzantine Revival
- Completed: 1909

Specifications
- Materials: red brick with sandstone dressings

Administration
- Province: Canterbury
- Diocese: Birmingham
- Archdeaconry: Aston
- Deanery: Yardley and Bordesley

St Benedict's Church, Bordesley is a Church of England parish church in Hob Moor Road, Bordesley, West Midlands, England, about 2 1/2 miles (4 km) east of Birmingham city centre. It is an early 20th-century church in Byzantine Revival style and is Grade II listed.

== History and description ==
St Oswald's Church, Small Heath established a mission church in the area in 1898. It was a temporary iron building.

The architects Nicol and Nicol of Birmingham designed the present church as its permanent replacement. It was built in 1909 and consecrated on 30 April 1910. It is in Byzantine Revival style, built of red brick with red sandstone dressings. The nave is flanked by north and south aisles. Between them are five-bay arcades with round-headed arches on sandstone piers. At the west end of the north aisle is a pedimented porch. A statue of Benedict of Nursia, the church's dedicatee, stands in a niche above its door.

At the east end of the church the chancel has an apse. Inside it is a Byzantine-style painting of the apse representing Christ in Majesty, with angels, and saints in arcading, below. It was painted by Henry Holiday between 1912 and 1919.

The church was made a Grade II listed building in July 1982. Its parish archives were deposited with Birmingham Central Library in February 1998 and are now with its successor, the Library of Birmingham.

== Organ ==
St Benedict's has an organ in the north aisle of the chancel. It that was built by CH Windridge of Birmingham. It pre-dates the church, having been built in 1894–95. It was modified about 1920 by Conacher of Sheffield. It has three manuals, one set of pedals and 22 stops.

== Vicarage ==
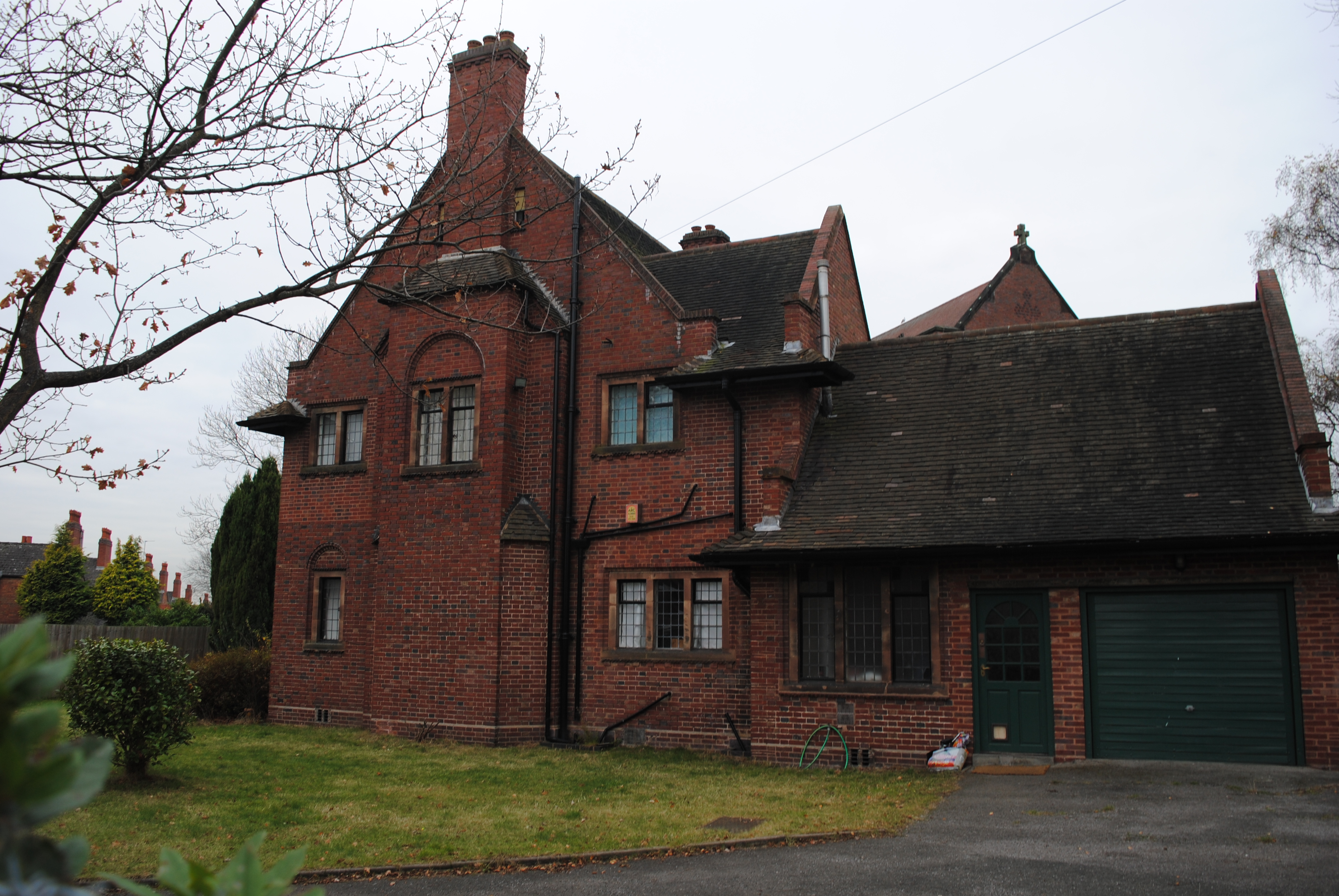
St Benedict's Vicarage

St Benedict's vicarage is next door to the church in Hob Moor Road. Like the church it was designed by Nicol and Nicol. It was built in 1911–12. English Heritage made it a Grade II listed building in 1997.
