= Dante's Dream =

1871 painting by Dante Gabriel Rossetti

Dante's Dream at the Time of the Death of Beatrice
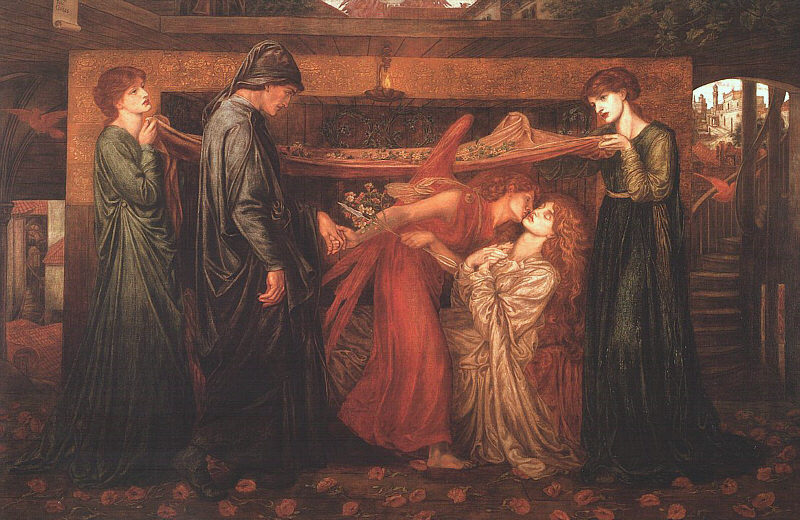
- Artist: Dante Gabriel Rossetti
- Year: 1871
- Medium: Oil on canvas
- Dimensions: 216 cm × 312.4 cm (85 in × 123.0 in)
- Location: Walker Art Gallery; Liverpool

Dante's Dream (full title Dante's Dream at the Time of the Death of Beatrice) is an oil on canvas painting from 1871 by the English Pre-Raphaelite painter Dante Gabriel Rossetti. It hangs in the Walker Art Gallery, in Liverpool.

He repeated a composition he had done in watercolour and gouache at a smaller scale in 1856. This is now in Tate Britain, measuring 48.7 cm (19.1 in) by 66.2 cm (26 in).

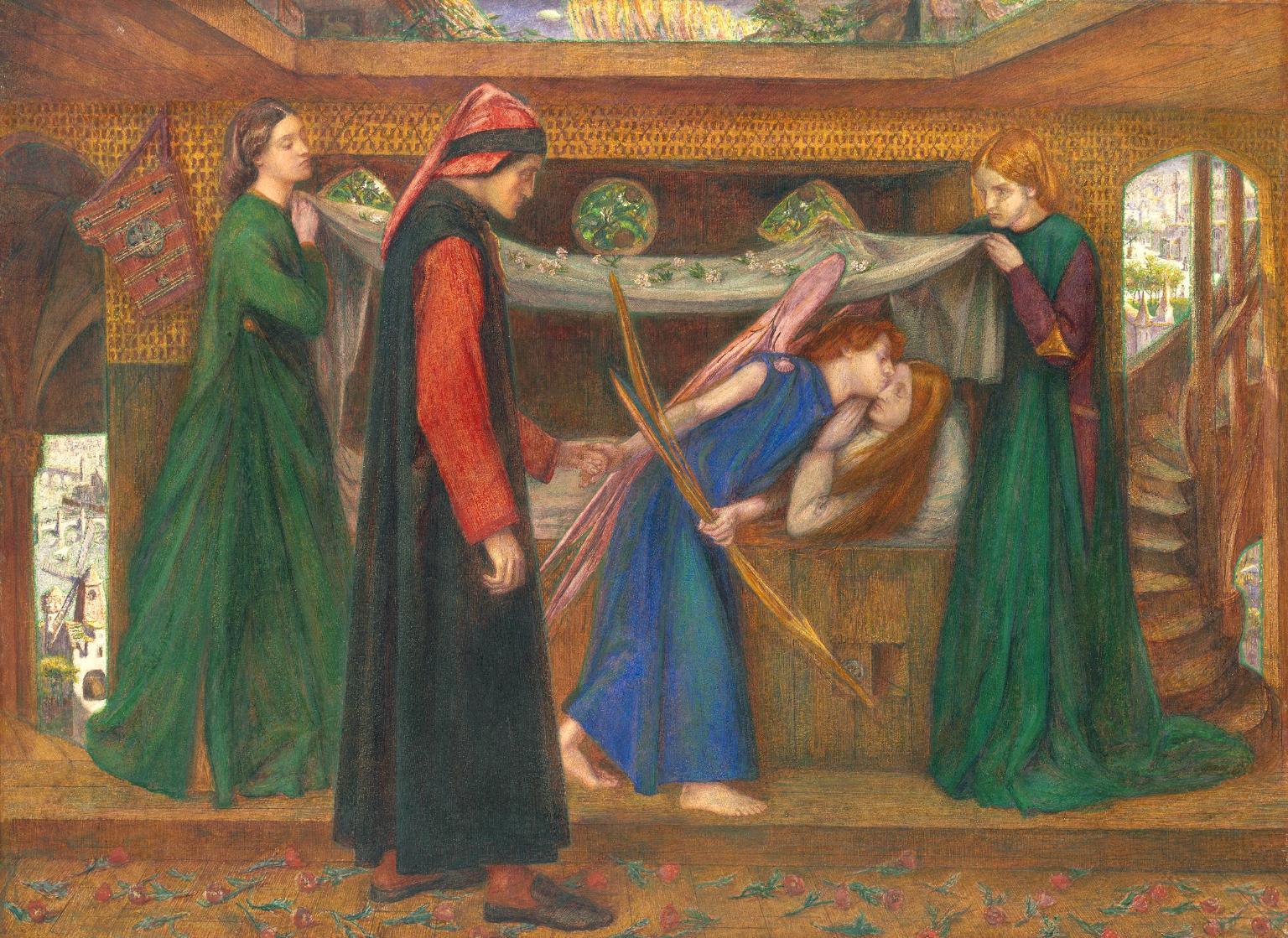
The 1856 watercolour, Tate Britain

Rossetti painted a smaller-scale replica (178 x 133 cm) of the painting with two predella panels in 1880, for his patron William Graham. In the Victoria Gallery at The_McManus: Dundee's Art Gallery and Museum, Dundee, Scotland.

Rossetti had a lifelong interest in the Italian poet Dante Alighieri. The painting was inspired by Dante's poem La Vita Nuova. In this poem Dante dreams that he is led to the death-bed of Beatrice Portinari, who was the object of his unfulfilled love. Dante, in black, stands looking towards the dying Beatrice who is lying on a bed. Two female figures in green hold a canopy over her. An angel in red holds Dante's hand and leans forward to kiss Beatrice.

In the painting, Rossetti creates a visionary world with complex symbols. The symbols include the green clothes of Beatrice's attendants, signifying hope; spring flowers in the foreground symbolising purity; and red doves for love.

It is Rossetti's largest painting. The model for Beatrice was Jane Morris, the wife of William Morris. Alexa Wilding & Marie Stillman posed as the grieving hand maidens. The Walker Art Gallery bought the painting directly from the artist in 1881 for £1575 (equivalent to £170,000 in 2025). The acquisition was negotiated by Victorian novelist Hall Caine. W B Yeats said,'... once at Liverpool on my way to Sligo I had seen" Dante's Dream " in the gallery there...and its colour,its people,its romantic architecture had blotted all other pictures away'. In 1897 it was sent to Berlin to be photographed, but was then noted to be "in a dirty condition". Again in 1904 the painting was noted to be in "a bad condition" and it was considered that its condition had been worsened by its journey to and from Berlin. The painting was sent in 1908 to the National Gallery in London to be relined, that is, for a new canvas to be glued to the original. It was then returned to Liverpool. During the Second World War, it was removed from its stretcher, rolled and stored in the basement of the gallery. In 1941 the painting was moved, together with other large paintings from the gallery, to Ellesmere College in Shropshire. It was noted at this time that it had sustained some damage. Conservation work was carried out on the painting in 1960 and in 1985.

Dante's Dream is a painting in oil on canvas, measuring 216 centimetres (85 in) by 312.4 centimetres (123 in). It was examined in 2003 and found to be in good condition, with no evidence of any recurrence of the former problems.

== See also ==
- List of paintings by Dante Gabriel Rossetti
