= Dante and Beatrice (painting) =

1883 painting by Henry Holiday

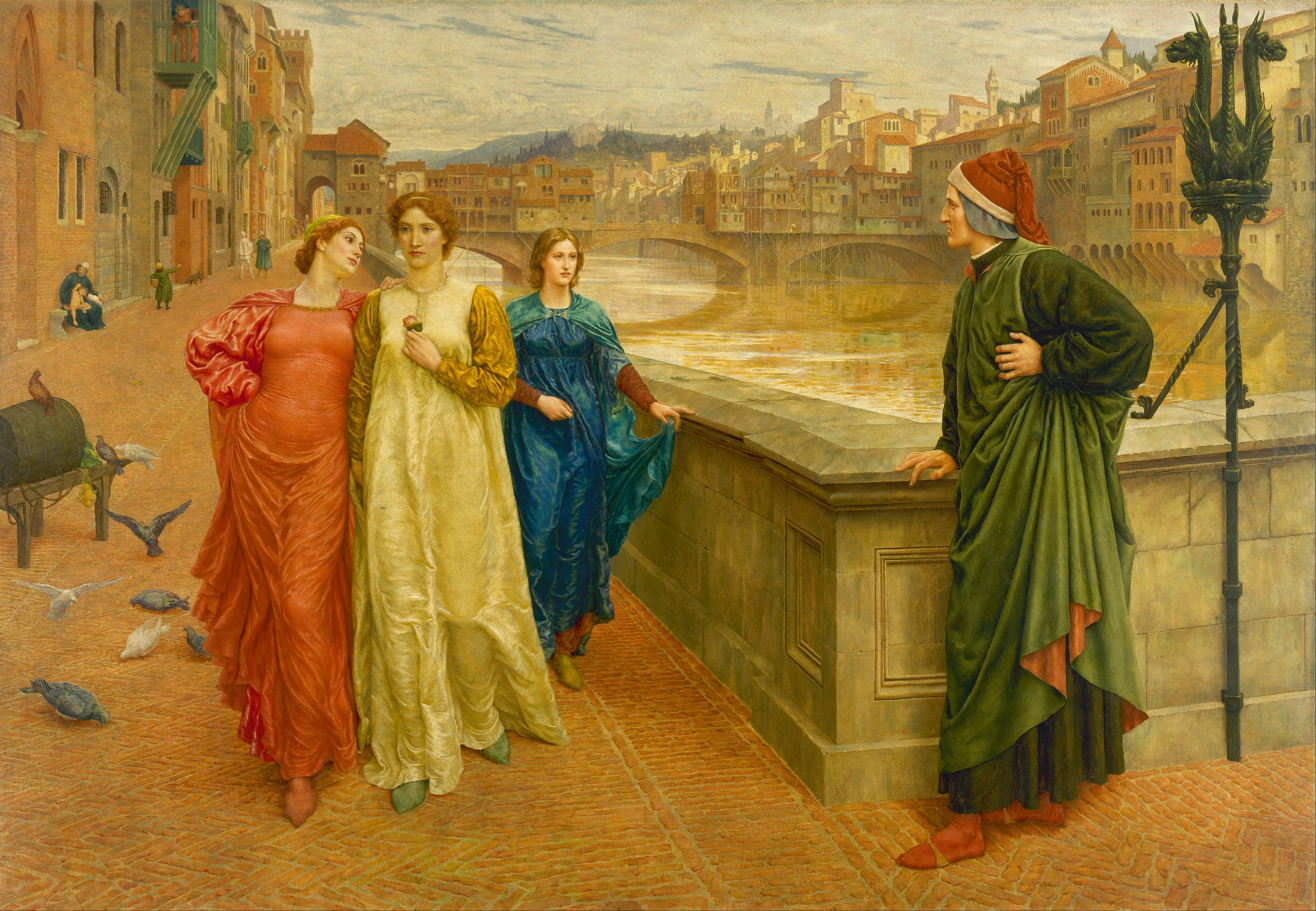
- Artist: Henry Holiday
- Year: 1883
- Medium: oil on canvas
- Dimensions: 142.2 cm × 203.2 cm (56.0 in × 80.0 in)
- Location: Walker Art Gallery; Liverpool

Dante and Beatrice is a painting dated 1883 by the artist Henry Holiday that is on display in the Walker Art Gallery, in Liverpool, England. It is considered to be Holiday's most important painting. It is executed in oil on canvas, measuring 142.2 centimetres (56 in) by 203.2 centimetres (80 in) and was purchased by the gallery in 1884.

When he died in 1927, Holiday was described as "the last Pre-Raphaelite." Many of Dante Gabriel Rossetti's paintings, including Dante's Dream, had as their subject the Italian poet Dante Alighieri, and this interest is the likely inspiration for Holiday's painting. It is based on Dante's 1294 autobiographical work La Vita Nuova which describes his love for Beatrice Portinari. Dante concealed his love by pretending to be attracted to other women. The painting depicts an incident when Beatrice, having heard gossip relating to this, refuses to speak to him. The event is shown as Beatrice and two other women walk past the Santa Trinita Bridge in Florence. Beatrice wears a white dress and walks beside her friend Monna Vanna, with Beatrice's maidservant slightly behind.

In 1860 Holiday had painted another scene from La Vita Nuova that showed a meeting between Dante and Beatrice when they were children in the garden of Beatrice's father, and in 1875 he painted a portrait of Dante. In addition to the completed painting of Dante and Beatrice, the Walker Art Gallery owns three sketches he made for it. Two of these depict all the figures, while the third is of Dante alone. Holiday had also made nude plaster statuettes of the two main female figures to which he later added clothing. These are also owned by the gallery. The model for Beatrice was Eleanor Butcher, Milly Hughes modelled for Monna Vanna, and the model for the maidservant was Kitty Lushington.

Holiday was anxious that the painting should be historically accurate and in 1881 travelled to Florence to carry out research. He discovered that in the 13th century the Lungarno, the street on the north side of the River Arno between the Ponte Vecchio (seen in the background) and the Ponte Santa Trinita, was paved with bricks and that there were shops in the area; these are shown in the painting. He also learned that the Ponte Vecchio had been destroyed in a flood in 1235. It was being rebuilt between 1285 and 1290 and in the painting it is shown covered in scaffolding.
