= Beatrice Portinari =

Dante's muse (1265–1290)

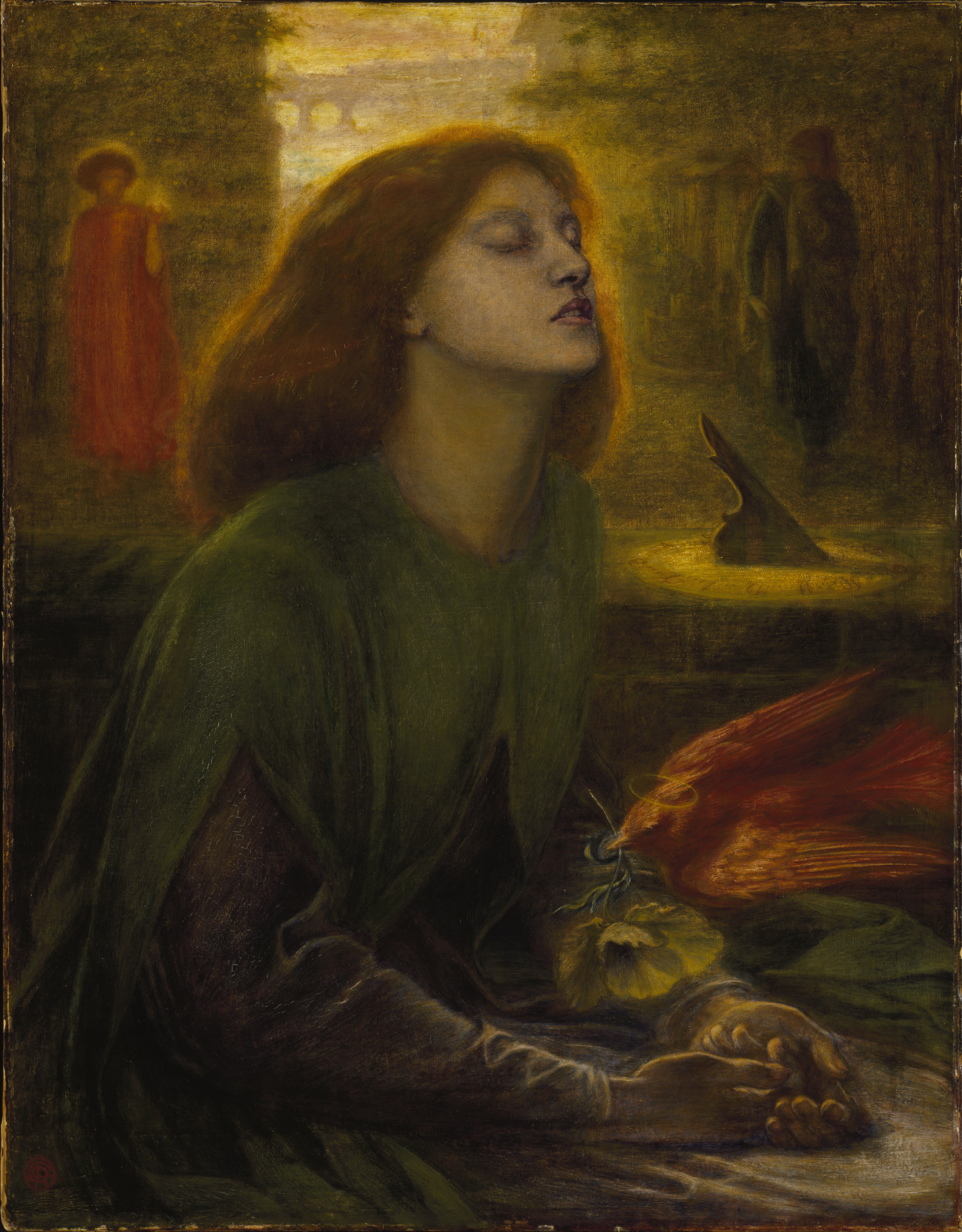
- Beata Beatrix by Dante Gabriel Rossetti (c. 1870)
- Born: Beatrice di Folco Portinari c. 1265; Florence, Republic of Florence
- Died: 8 or 19 June 1290 (age 25); Florence, Republic of Florence
- Other name: Bice (birth name)
- Known for: Inspiration for Dante Alighieri's Vita Nuova and Divine Comedy
- Spouse: Simone dei Bardi (m. 1287)
- Parent: Folco di Ricovero Portinari (father)

Beatrice "Bice" di Folco Portinari (Italian: [beaˈtriːtʃe portiˈnaːri]; 1265 – 8 or 19 June 1290) was an Italian woman who has been commonly identified as the principal inspiration for Dante Alighieri's Vita Nuova, and is also identified with the Beatrice who acts as his guide in the last book of his narrative poem the Divine Comedy (La Divina Commedia), Paradiso, and during the conclusion of the preceding Purgatorio. In the Comedy, Beatrice symbolises divine grace and theology. Although there are no known images of her in life, several artists have since painted imagined portraits.

== Biography ==
Beatrice was the daughter of the banker Folco Portinari and was married to another banker, Simone dei Bardi. Dante claims to have met a "Beatrice" only twice, on occasions separated by nine years, but was so affected by the meetings that he carried his love for her throughout his life. The tradition that identifies Bice di Folco Portinari as the Beatrice loved by Dante is now widely, though not unanimously, accepted by scholars. Boccaccio, in his commentary on the Divine Comedy, was the first one to explicitly refer to the woman; all later references are dependent on his unsubstantiated identification. Clear documents on her life have always been scarce, rendering even her existence doubtful. The only hard evidence is the will of Folco Portinari from 1287, which says, "Item d. Bici filie sue et uxoris d. Simonis del Bardis reliquite [...], lib.50 ad floren." The sentence is essentially a bequest to Portinari's daughter, who was married to Simone dei Bardi. Portinari was a rich banker, born in Portico di Romagna. He moved to Florence and lived in a house near Dante where he had six daughters. Portinari also gave generously to found the hospital of Santa Maria Nuova.

== In the works of Dante Alighieri ==
Scholars have long debated whether the historical Beatrice should be identified with the Beatrice of Dante's writing. Certainly Beatrice Portinari fits the broad biographical criteria, and it is entirely possible that she and Dante knew each other—but the Beatrice of Dante's canon does not seem to rely on any such correspondence and exists as a literary character who bears only a passing resemblance to her historical antecedent.

=== Vita Nuova ===
Beatrice first appears in the autobiographical text La Vita Nuova, which Dante wrote around 1293. The Vita Nuova's autoethnographical poetry and prose present Beatrice, and the poet's passion for her, in the context of Dante's own social and romantic reality. Dante's portrayal of Beatrice in the Vita Nuova is unambiguously positive, but at this early stage resembles the more generic attitude of the courtly lady, rather than the sharply defined personality for which Beatrice is famous in the Commedia.

According to Dante, he first met Beatrice when his father, Alighiero di Bellincione, took him to the Portinari house for a May Day party. They were both nine years old at the time, though Beatrice was a few months younger. Dante was instantly taken with her and remained so throughout his life in Florence—even though she married another man, the banker Simone de' Bardi, in 1287. For his part, Dante married Gemma Donati, a cousin of one of the most politically prominent families in Florence, in 1285. Despite this entanglement, he seems to have retained some feeling for Beatrice, even after her death in 1290. As Dante tells us in the Vita Nuova, he withdrew into intense study after Beatrice's death and began composing poems dedicated to her memory. The collection of these poems, along with others he had previously written in praise of Beatrice, became what we now know as the Vita Nuova.

The manner in which Dante chose to express his love for Beatrice, in both the Vita Nuova and Divine Comedy, is in line with the medieval notion of courtly love. Courtly love was a sometimes secret, often unrequited, and always respectful form of admiration for a lady. It is also first and foremost a literary conceit, rather than an actual form of intimacy. It was not uncommon for the lady in question to have no idea of her courtly admirer, and for the admirer in question not to be interested in a real relationship at all. Instead, the courtly lady serves as a subject for the lover to exercise his poetic skill, or even to discuss philosophy, in the practice of praising her. Whether or not Dante had any feelings for his neighbor Beatrice Portinari, courtly love is the modality he chooses to convey his passion, which suggests a degree of remove (at least) between historical reality and autobiographical narrative.

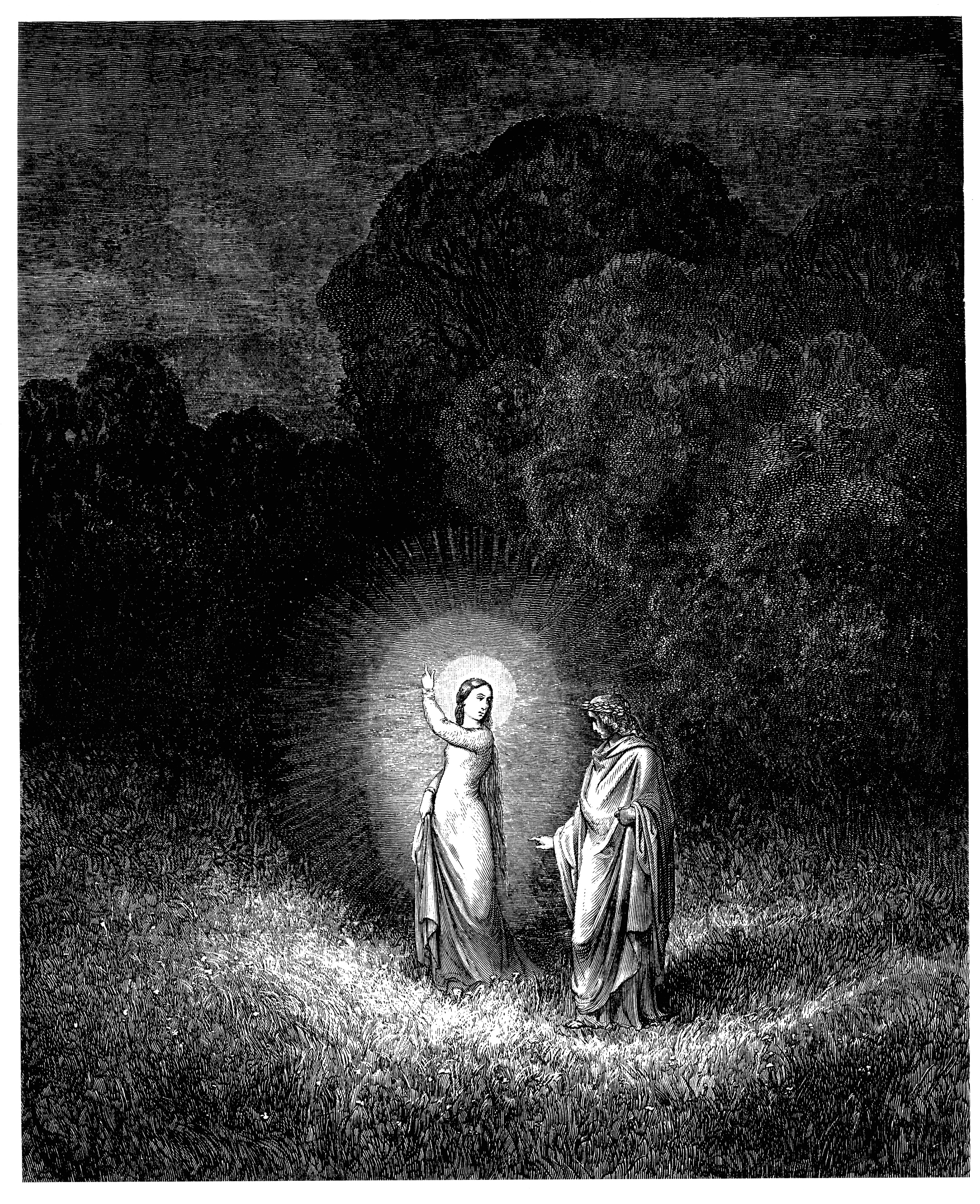
Beatrice appears to Virgil at the start of Inferno, in an illustration by Gustave Doré.

=== Divine Comedy ===
At the beginning of the Inferno, when Virgil appears to guide Dante through the afterlife, he explains that he was sent by Beatrice. She herself was moved to intercede by the Virgin Mary and Saint Lucia. She is referenced frequently throughout his journey through hell and purgatory as a source of inspiration and comfort.

Beatrice personally appears near the end of the Purgatorio to take over as guide from the Latin poet Virgil because, as a pagan, Virgil cannot enter Paradise. Moreover, Beatrice, being the incarnation of beatific love (as her name implies), is uniquely suited to lead the pilgrim into the realm of divine bliss. Naturally, then, it is Beatrice who must lead the pilgrim into heaven. Where Virgil is understood as human reason and philosophy, Beatrice represents religious knowledge and passion: theology, faith, contemplation, and grace. Philosophy is suited to guide the pilgrim through the less holy realms of sin and repentance, but only divine faith can completely lead the soul to God.

Despite representing divine love, Beatrice's appearance to Dante in the Garden of Eden in Purgatorio is not a joyous reunion. She berates him for weeping when Virgil disappears, and then for abandoning her memory after her death and indulging in sin to such a degree that she had to intercede on his behalf to save him. As Beatrice guides Dante through the spheres of Heaven, she grows increasingly beautiful and indescribable, representing Dante's progress towards God. She frequently corrects Dante during his journey, acting as a spiritual guide and source of wisdom. Contrary to her initial harsh treatment, throughout Paradiso Beatrice is encouraging and patient towards Dante, taking joy in his gradual progress. When they reach the Empyrean, she leaves him to take her proper place there. Saint Bernard guides Dante for the final portion of his journey. He points out Beatrice's place in the Empyrean among several glorified women from the Bible.

Dante compares Beatrice's direction of the pageant of the Church in the Garden to an admiral commanding his ship, an unusual masculine simile that has troubled the critical reading of Beatrice as a courtly lady. Her digressions on multiple academic subjects in the Paradiso also diverge from the typical portrayal of the courtly beloved, who exists as an object of praise, rather than a subject of discourse. For example, the first of these discourses is on optics, concerning the markings on the moon, and the scientific method in general. She is frequently viewed as a Christ figure, owing to her death, the "new life" Dante finds through her in La Vita Nuova, and her interceding before God to save Dante's soul in the Comedy.

== Legacy ==
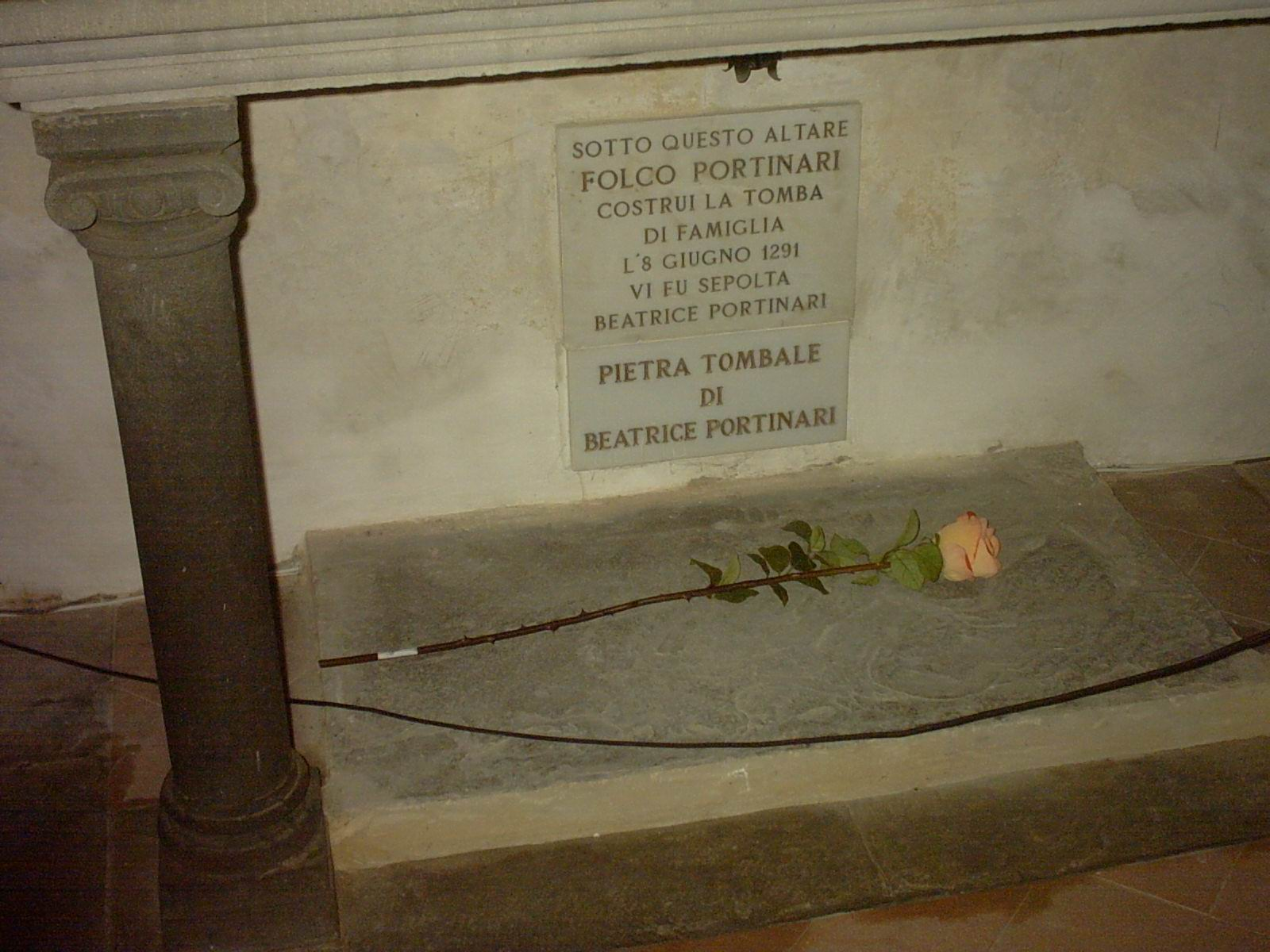
The tomb of Beatrice Portinari in the Chiesa di Santa Margherita dei Cerchi, Florence

=== Modern art ===
Beatrice Portinari has been immortalized not only in Dante's poems but in paintings by Pre-Raphaelite artists and poets in the nineteenth century. Subjects taken from Dante Alighieri's La Vita Nuova, especially the idealization of Beatrice, inspired a great deal of Dante Gabriel Rossetti's art in the 1850s, in particular after the death of his wife Elizabeth Siddal. He idealized her image as Dante's Beatrice in a number of paintings, such as Beata Beatrix.

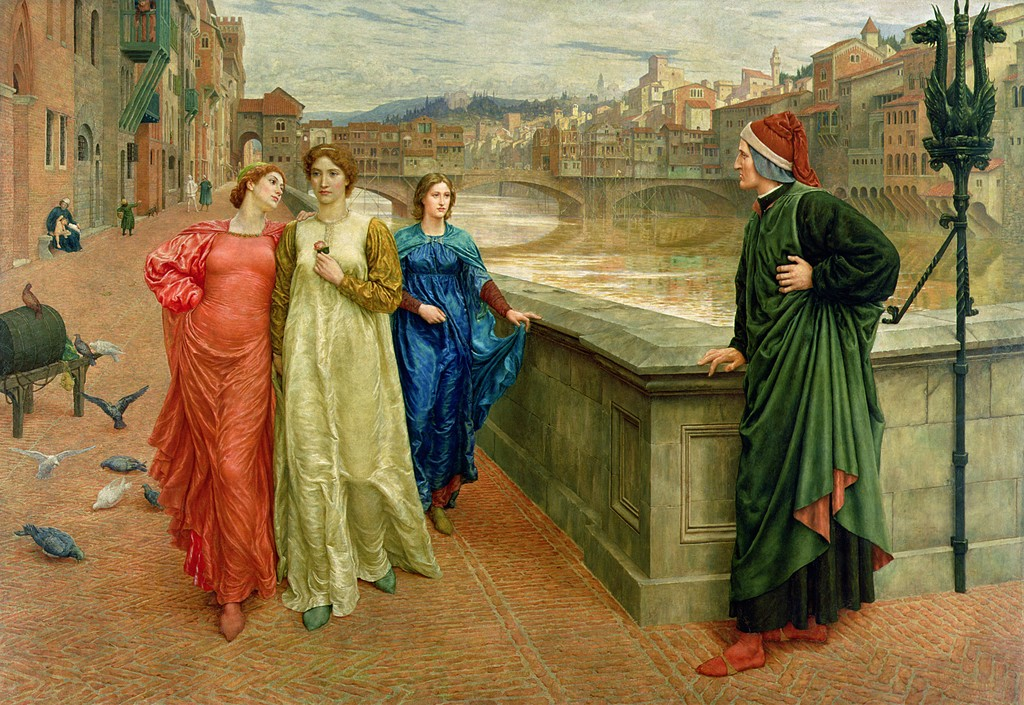
Dante and Beatrice, by Henry Holiday (1883). Dante looks longingly at Beatrice (in center) passing by with friend Lady Vanna (red) along the Arno River

=== In popular culture ===
Asteroid 83 Beatrix in the asteroid belt is named in her honor, befitting of her role as Dante's guide through the heavenly spheres.

The Dante Alighieri Academy Beatrice Campus, a Catholic high school in Toronto, Ontario, Canada is named after Portinari.

In the book series A Series of Unfortunate Events by Lemony Snicket, Snicket's love interest is named Beatrice. The relationship between the characters is very similar to that of Beatrice Portinari and Dante.

In the 2014 animated miniseries Over the Garden Wall, the main characters Wirt and Greg are guided through the Unknown, a place implied to be the afterlife, by a bluebird named Beatrice. This is one of many parallels between the two works.

Beatrice is one of the key characters of Ryukishi07's visual novel series Umineko When They Cry, which itself is a large homage to Dante's work.

== See also ==
- Dante and Beatrice (disambiguation)
