= Santa Margherita de' Cerchi =

Roman Catholic church in Florence

Coordinates: 43°46′16.51″N 11°15′26.31″E

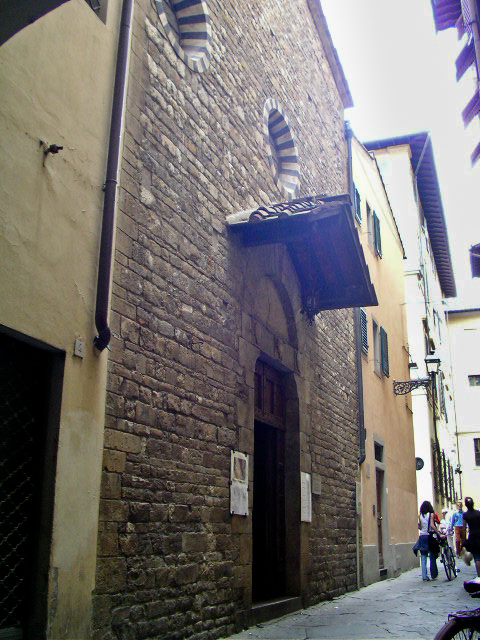
Entrance portal of Chiesa di Santa Margherita de'Cerchi.

The Chiesa di Santa Margherita de' Cerchi is a 13th-century, Roman Catholic church dedicated to Margaret the Virgin in the centre of Florence, region of Tuscany, Italy. It is among the oldest churches in Florence.

== History ==
It is first recorded in 1032 and is said, contentiously, to have been the location of Dante's marriage to Gemma Donati in 1285 or 1290. It was certainly the Donati family's parish church and also contains several tombs of the Portinari family, to which Dante's great love Beatrice Portinari belonged, including Monna Tessa, her nursemaid.

The church was consecrated on the day of Saint Margaret. The main patron families of the church in the 13th and 14th century, who had chapels in the church, were the Cerchi, the Donati, and the Adimari families.

The church contains a fine altarpiece of the Madonna and Four Saints by Neri di Bicci. In the entrance is a chapel erected by Jacopo Salviati and his wife, Lucrezia de' Medici.

Tradition holds that visitors can plead in writing to Beatrice to ask her to fix their love lives, leaving the letters in a basket next to her shrine.
