= La Vita Nuova =

Text by Dante Alighieri published in 1294

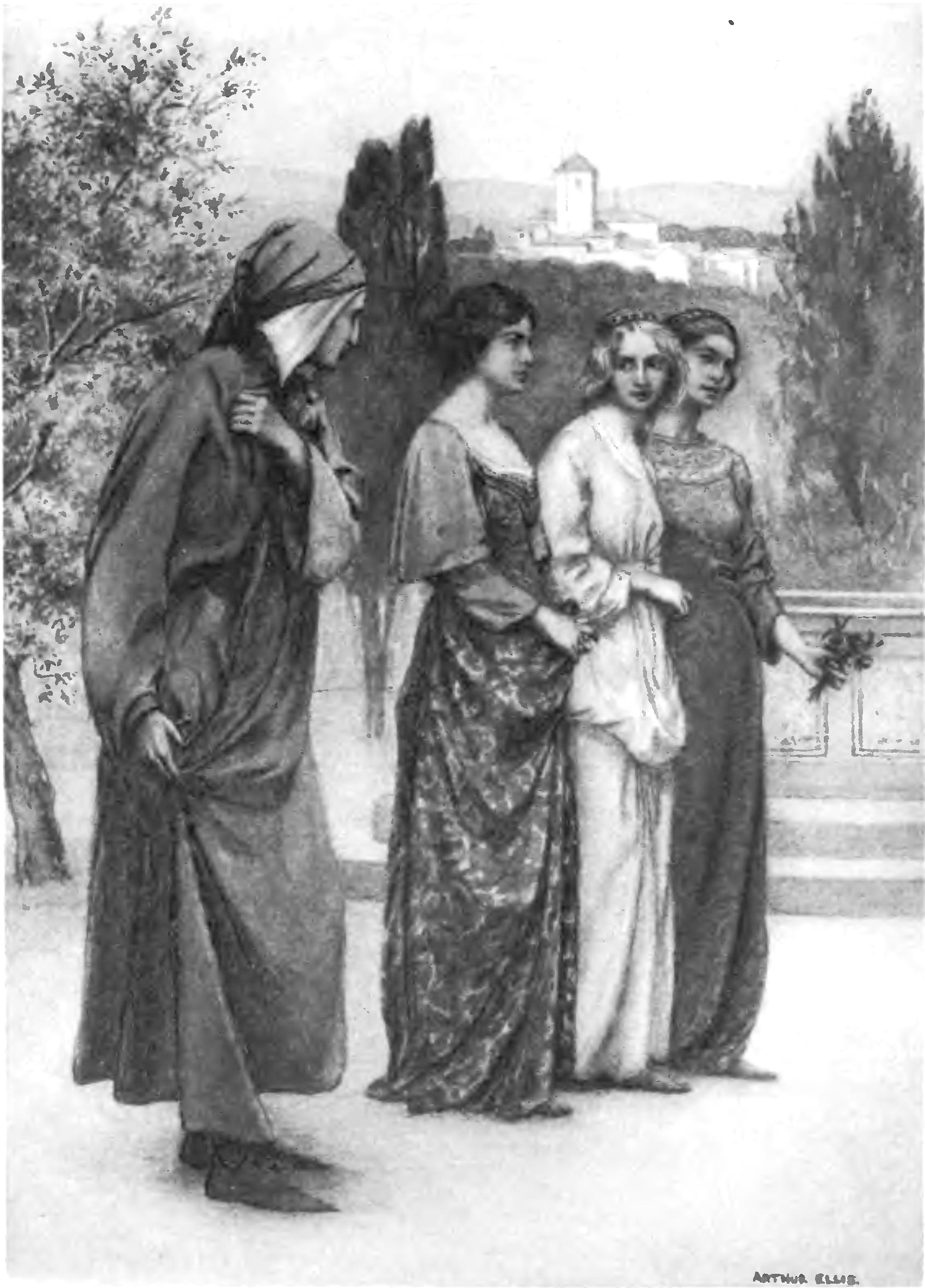
Frontispiece of the English version (The New Life, D. G. Rossetti, 1899)

La Vita Nuova (pronounced [la ˈviːta ˈnwɔːva]; modern Italian for "The New Life") or Vita Nova (Latin and medieval Italian title) is a text by Dante Alighieri published in 1294. Focused on Dante's lifelong love for his beloved Beatrice, it is an expression of the medieval genre of courtly love in a prosimetrum style, a combination of both prose and verse.

== History and context ==
Referred to by Dante as his libello, or "little book", La Vita Nuova is the first of two collections of verse written by Dante in his life. The collection is a prosimetrum, a piece containing both verse and prose, in the vein of Boethius' Consolation of Philosophy or Ibn Hazm's The Ring of the Dove (1022 CE). Dante used each prosimetrum as a means for combining poems written over periods of roughly ten years—La Vita Nuova contains his works from before 1283 to roughly 1293. The collection and its style fit in with the movement called dolce stil novo.

The prose creates the illusion of narrative continuity between the poems; it is Dante's way of reconstructing himself and his art in terms of his evolving sense of the limitations of courtly love (the system of ritualized love and art that Dante and his poet-friends inherited from the Provençal poets, the Sicilian poets of the court of Frederick II, and the Tuscan poets before them). Sometime in his twenties, Dante decided to try to write love poetry that was less centered on the self and more aimed at love itself. He intended to elevate courtly love poetry into sacred love poetry. Beatrice for Dante was the embodiment of this kind of love—transparent to the Absolute, inspiring the integration of desire aroused by beauty with the longing of the soul for divine splendor.

The first full translation into English was published by Joseph Garrow in 1846.

== Structure ==
La Vita Nuova contains 42 brief chapters (31 according to Guglielmo Gorni) with commentaries on 25 sonnets, one ballata, and four canzoni; one canzone is left unfinished, interrupted by the death of Beatrice Portinari, Dante's lifelong love.

Dante's two-part commentaries explain each poem, placing them within the context of his life. The chapters containing poems consist of three parts: the semi-autobiographical narrative, the lyric that resulted from those circumstances, and brief structural outline of the lyric. The poems present a frame story, recounting Dante's love of Beatrice from his first sight of her (when both were nine years old) all the way to his mourning after her death, and his determination to write of her "that which has never been written of any woman."

Each separate section of commentary further refines Dante's concept of romantic love as the initial step in a spiritual development that results in the capacity for divine love (see courtly love). Dante's unusual approach to his piece — drawing upon personal events and experience, addressing the readers, and writing in Italian rather than Latin — marked a turning point in European poetry, when many writers abandoned highly stylized forms of writing for a simpler style.

== Elements of autobiography ==
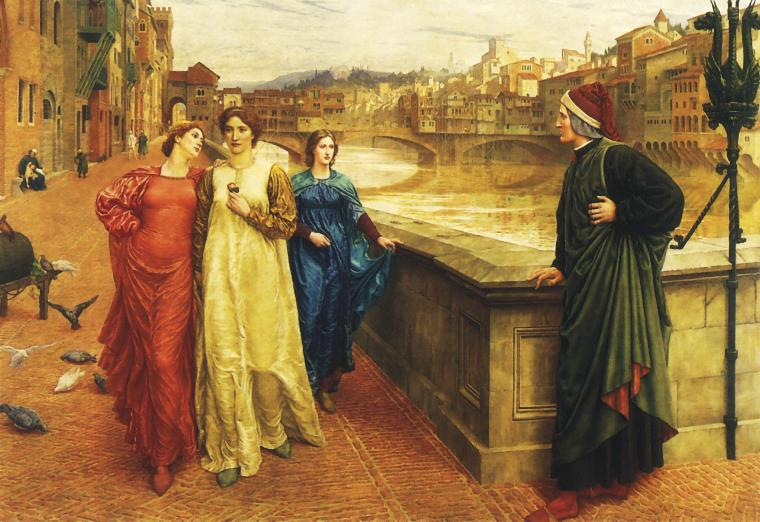
Henry Holiday's 1883 Dante and Beatrice is inspired by La Vita Nuova (Beatrice is in yellow)

Dante wanted to collect and publish the lyrics dealing with his love for Beatrice, explaining the autobiographical context of its composition and pointing out the expository structure of each lyric as an aid to careful reading. The result is an important early example of emotional autobiography, as was Saint Augustine's Confessions in the 5th century. However, like all medieval literature, it is far removed from the modern autobiographical impulse.

Dante and his audience were also interested in the emotions of courtly love and how they develop, how they are expressed in verse, how they reveal the permanent intellectual truths of the divinely created world and how love can confer blessing on the soul and bring it closer to God.

The names of the people in the poem, including Beatrice herself, are employed without use of surnames or any details that would assist readers to identify them among the many people of Florence. Only the name "Beatrice" is used, because that was both her actual name and her symbolic name as the conferrer of blessing. Ultimately the names and people work as metaphors.

In chapter XXIV, "I Felt My Heart Awaken" ("Io mi senti' svegliar dentro a lo core", also translated as "I Felt a Loving Spirit Suddenly"), Dante recounts a meeting with Love, who asks the poet to do his best to honour her.

Io mi senti' svegliar dentro a lo core
Un spirito amoroso che dormia:
E poi vidi venir da lungi Amore
Allegro sì, che appena il conoscia,

Dicendo: "Or pensa pur di farmi onore";
E 'n ciascuna parola sua ridia.
E poco stando meco il mio segnore,
Guardando in quella parte onde venia,

Io vidi monna Vanna e monna Bice
Venire inver lo loco là 'v'io era,
L'una appresso de l'altra miriviglia;

E sì come la mente mi ridice,
Amor mi disse: "Quell'è Primavera,
E quell'ha nome Amor, sì mi somiglia."

Translation:

I felt myself waking up inside my core
A loving spirit that sleeps:
And then I saw Love coming from afar
Cheerful yes, as soon as he knows it

saying, "You think you can honour me;"
and with each word laughing.
And little being with me my lord,
watching the way it came from,

I saw Lady Joan and Lady Bice
coming towards the spot I was,
one wonder past another wonder.

And as my mind keeps telling me,
Love said to me: "She is Spring who springs first,
and that bears the name Love, who resembles me."

Dante does not name himself in La Vita Nuova. He refers to Guido Cavalcanti as "the first of my friends", to his own sister as "a young and noble lady... who was related to me by the closest consanguinity", to Beatrice's brother similarly as one who "was so linked in consanguinity to the glorious lady that no-one was closer to her". The reader is invited into the very emotional turmoil and lyrical struggle of the unnamed author's own mind and all the surrounding people in his story are seen in their relations to that mind's quest of encountering Love.

La Vita Nuova is helpful for understanding the context of his other works, principally La Commedia.

== Influence ==
La Vita Nuova is notable not only for its content but also for being written in the Tuscan vernacular, rather than Latin; Dante's work helped to establish Tuscan as the basis for the national Italian language.

American poet Wallace Stevens called the text "one of the great documents of Christianity", noting that the text displays the influence of Christianity in promulgating "the distinctly feminine virtues in place of the sterner ideals of antiquity."

== Cultural references ==
The Henry Holiday painting Dante and Beatrice (1883) is inspired by La Vita Nuova, as was Dante Gabriel Rossetti's The Salutation of Beatrice (1859). Rossetti translated the work into English in 1848 and used the character name Monna Vanna from it as a title for his 1866 painting Monna Vanna.

La vita nuova is a 1902 cantata based on the text by Ermanno Wolf-Ferrari.

Vladimir Martynov's 2003 opera Vita Nuova premiered in the U.S. on February 28, 2009 at the Alice Tully Hall, performed by the London Philharmonic Orchestra, conducted by Vladimir Jurowski.

A modified version of the opening line of the work's Introduction was used on the television show Star Trek: Voyager in the episode "Latent Image" (1999). The Doctor is concerned with a moral situation and Captain Janeway reads this book and leaves the Doctor to discover the poem.

The author Allegra Goodman wrote a short story entitled "La Vita Nuova", published in the May 3, 2010 issue of The New Yorker, in which Dante's words (in English) are interspersed throughout the piece.

Turkish novelist and Nobel Laureate Orhan Pamuk's 1994 novel Yeni Hayat (generally translated as The New Life) takes its title from Dante's original work. The novel's basic allegorical idea is also taken from Dante's work, but transposed to 1970s Türkiye, where political ideology is the spark that transforms the narrator's life.

== Bibliography ==
- Dante (2012). Vita Nova. Translation and introduction by Andrew Frisardi. Evanston, IL: Northwestern University Press. p. 408. ISBN 978-0-8101-2721-0.
- Dante (1992). Vita Nuova. Translated by Mark Musa. Oxford: Oxford UP. ISBN 978-0-19-954065-5.
- Frisardi, Andrew (2013). The Young Dante and the One Love. London: Temenos Academy. p. 48. ISBN 978-0956407887.
