= Henry Holiday =

British artist (1839–1927)

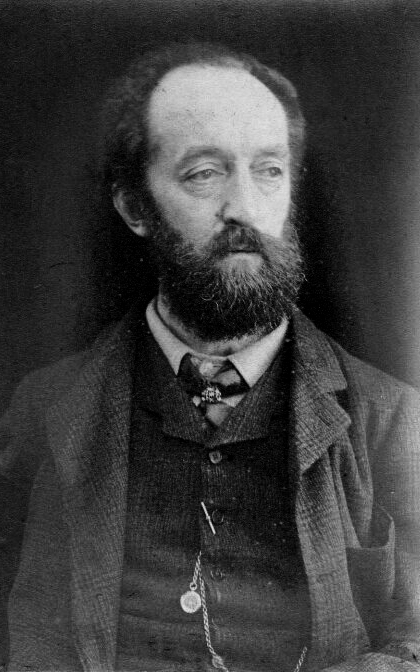
- Henry Holiday in the 1870s
- Born: 17 June 1839; London, England
- Died: 15 April 1927 (aged 87); London, England
- Education: Royal Academy Schools
- Known for: Painting, stained-glass designer, illustrator, sculptor
- Style: Romanticism
- Movement: Pre-Raphaelite Brotherhood
- Spouse: Catherine Holiday
- Relatives: Winifred Raven Holiday (daughter)

Henry Holiday (17 June 1839 – 15 April 1927) was an English Victorian painter of historical genre and landscapes, also a stained-glass designer, illustrator, and sculptor. He was influenced by the Pre-Raphaelite Brotherhood, many of whom he knew.

== Life ==
=== Early years and training ===
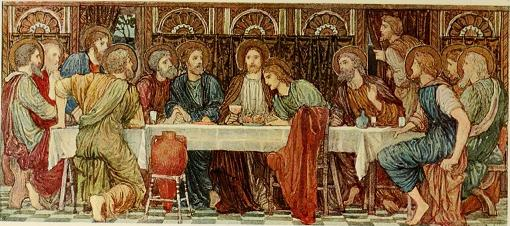
The Last Supper: panel in St Chad's Church, Kirkby

Holiday was born in London. He showed an early aptitude for art and was given lessons by William Cave Thomas. He attended Leigh's art academy (where a fellow student was Frederick Walker) and in 1855, at the age of 15, was admitted to the Royal Academy Schools. Through his friendship with Albert Moore and Simeon Solomon he was introduced to the artists Dante Gabriel Rossetti, Edward Burne-Jones and William Morris of the Pre-Raphaelite Brotherhood. This movement was to be pivotal in his future artistic and political life.

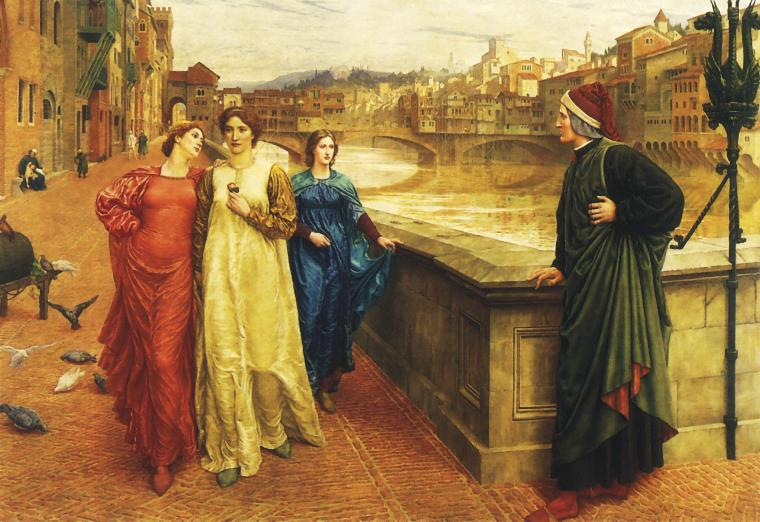
Dante and Beatrice (1883)

In the same year, 1855, Holiday made a journey to the Lake District. This was to be the first of many trips to the area, where he would often holiday for long periods of time. Whilst there, he spent much of his time sketching the views which were to be seen from the various hills and mountains. He wrote, "For concentrated loveliness, I know nothing that can quite compare with the lakes and mountains of Westmorland, Cumberland and Lancashire".

=== Paintings ===
Holiday worked in both oils and watercolours. In 1858, his first picture, a landscape painting, was exhibited at the Royal Academy and immediately sold; from that year his work was frequently shown at the Academy and elsewhere. Other pictures include:

- The Burgess of Calais (1859).
- The Bride and the Daughters of Jerusalem (1861–63). In his Reminiscences, Holiday explains that the painting was 'more ambitious than anything I had hitherto undertaken'. It showed the daughters of Jerusalem asking the Bride where her Beloved had gone (see Song of Solomon 6:1) and stood at 4 feet 6 inches by 3 feet, containing seven figures (including a little girl) and a full background of foliage. He began work on it among the scenery of North Wales in 1861 but in 1863 it was rejected by the Royal Academy selection committee, unlike his two previous figure paintings. Holiday described this as 'a heavy blow' but 'the rejections this year were of so extraordinary a character, and the show of the work on the walls was so poor, that there was a general storm of indignation' (Reminiscences p 95). At the suggestion of Holman Hunt, a number of rejected paintings were exhibited instead at the Cosmopolitan Club, which attracted attention and acclaim from visitors including William Makepeace Thackeray (p. 96). James McNeill Whistler singled out Holiday's painting and said "Do you mean to say they rejected that!". Richard Redgrave, himself a member of the Royal Academy, attempted to apologise for and explain the Royal Academy's selection, saying 'You know they can't hang everything that comes in higgledy-piggledy'; to which Whistler replied 'Why, what do you call your present exhibition, isn't that higgledy – and particularly piggledy?' (p. 96). The painting was bought from the artist by Thomas Milward Kitchin, later of Great Down in Seale, Surrey, but has now disappeared. There is, however, a full page illustration of it between pp 96–97 of the Reminiscences.
- The Rhine Maidens (1879). The subject matter was taken from Wagner's opera Das Rheingold. In order to properly visualise the picture, Holiday modelled the three Rhine maidens in clay and placed them in a tank of blue-green tinted water together with clay "rocks".
- Dante and Beatrice, exhibited at the Grosvenor Gallery in 1883. In 1881, Holiday had travelled to Florence in order to make studies for this picture, and carried out meticulous research to ensure that the correct buildings and architectural features were present. He also created rough clay models of some of the buildings to set the scene. The pigeons in the picture were painted by John Trivett Nettleship.
- Charity, a stained-glass window design (1887, Royal Academy), Terpsichore, Cleopatra, Sleep, The Lute player, The Temple of Philae, Hawes Water (1918, watercolour) and many others.

Holiday spent much time at the studios of Sir Edward Burne-Jones, where groups of artists would meet to discuss, exchange and pool ideas. The influence of Burne-Jones can be seen in Holiday's work.

=== Stained glass ===
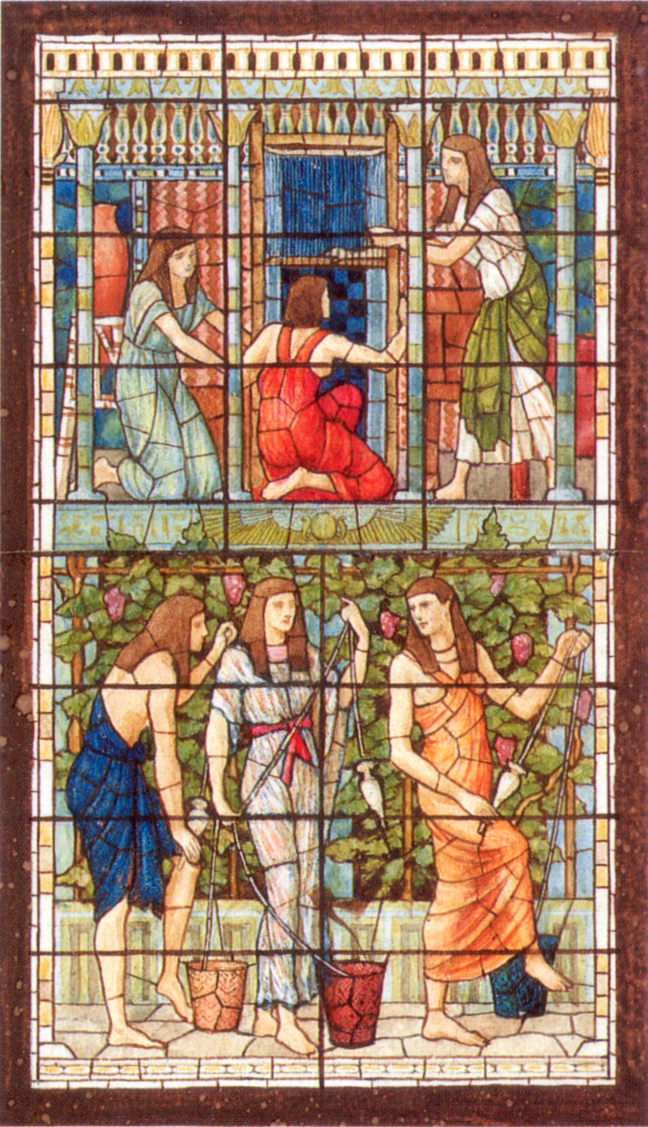
Modello or cartoon for three-panel stained glass window in the Royal Ontario Museum

In 1861, Holiday accepted the position of stained glass window designer for Powell's Glass Works, after Burne-Jones had left to work for Morris & Co. During his time there he fulfilled over 300 commissions, mostly for customers in the United States. He left in 1891 to set up his own glass works in Hampstead, producing stained glass, mosaics, enamels and sacerdotal objects.

Holiday's stained glass work can be found all over Britain. Some of his best is at the chapel of Worcester College, Oxford (c.1865); Westminster Abbey (the Isambard Kingdom Brunel memorial window, 1868); St Luke's Church, Kentish Town; St Mary Magdalene, Paddington (1869); and Chartered Accountants' Hall, Moorgate. In 2018, four of his stained-glass windows were reinstalled in Chartered Accountants' Hall after being lost for almost 50 years following their removal for an extension in 1970.

Examples in the United States of Holiday's work may be seen in the sacristy of St. John's Chapel, Groton School (Groton, Massachusetts—panels by Holiday repurposed from the School's original chapel), and in Grace Church in New York City.

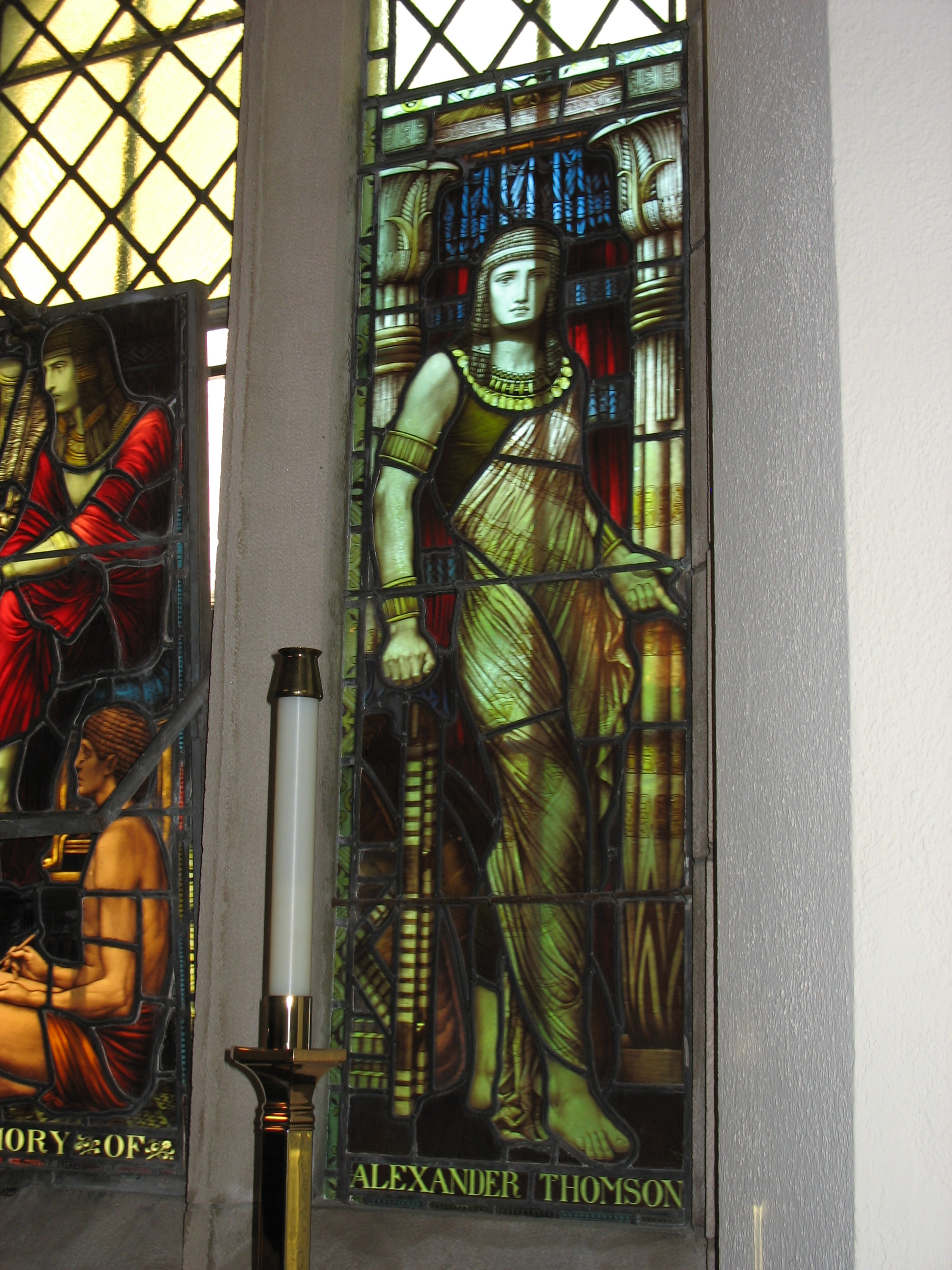

=== Other work and personal life ===
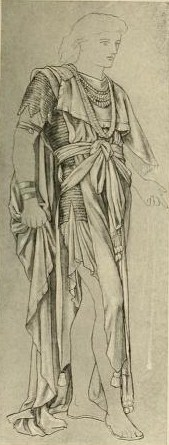
Study of drapery

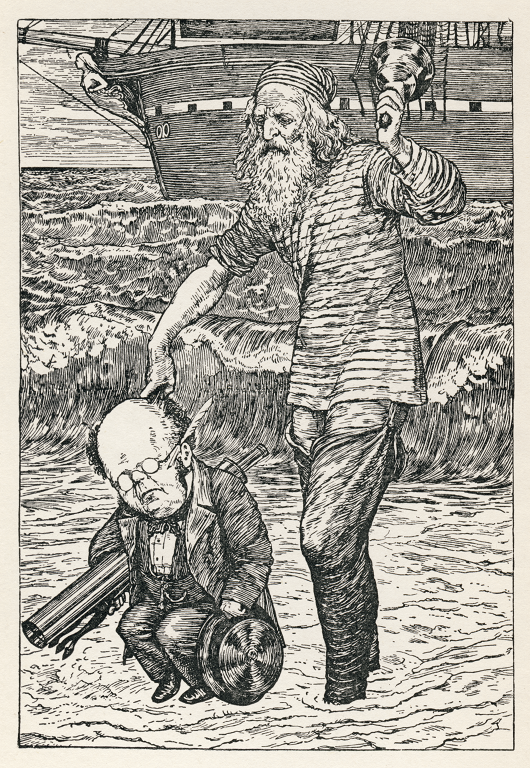
Hunting of the Snark, plate 1

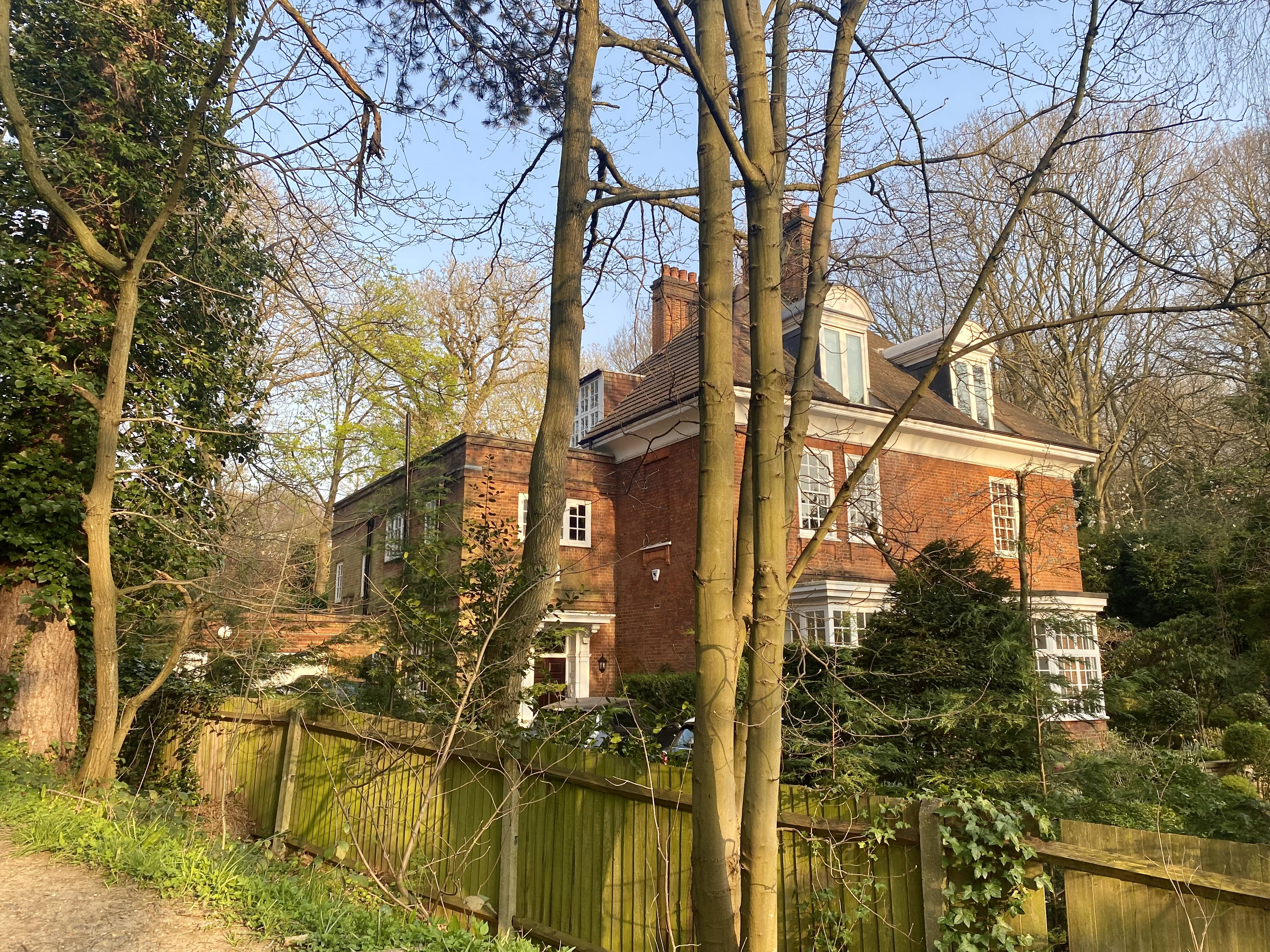
Oak Tree House in Hampstead, designed for Holiday by Basil Champneys

Holiday also created some sculpture, in 1861 producing a piece called Sleep which attracted favourable critical interest.

Holiday worked for architect William Burges for a period, including providing wall and ceiling paintings for Worcester College, Oxford (1863–64) and furniture paintings – including Sleeping Beauty for the headboard in the bedroom – at Burges's London home, The Tower House. The Sleeping Beauty bed is now in the collection of the Higgins Art Gallery & Museum, Bedford. Holiday has four oil paintings in British national public collections.

In October 1864, Holiday married Catherine Raven (1839-1924) and they moved to Bayswater, London. His wife was a talented embroiderer who worked for Morris & Co. They had one daughter, Winifred (1866–1949).

In 1867, Holiday visited Italy for the first time and was inspired by the originality of the Renaissance artists he saw on display there. In 1871 he went to Ceylon as part of the "Eclipse Expedition". His astronomical drawings were subsequently published in the national press and attracted great interest.

On his return to England in 1872, he commissioned architect Basil Champneys to design a new family home in Branch Hill, Hampstead, which was named "Oak Tree House". In 1888, William Gladstone was a visitor.

In July 1875, Holiday was commissioned by Lewis Carroll to illustrate The Hunting of the Snark. He remained a friend of the author throughout his life. Carroll died in 1898. Holiday's illustration to the chapter The Banker's Fate might contain pictorial references to the etching The Image Breakers by Marcus Gheeraerts the Elder, to William Sidney Mount's painting The Bone Player, and to a photograph by Benjamin Duchenne used for a drawing in Charles Darwin's The Expression of Emotions in Man and Animals.

From 1899, Holiday worked with Jessie Mothersole as studio assistant and she remained closely associated with the family until Holiday's death. In 1906 Holiday gave Mothersole a drawing of his daughter Winifred, which later was acquired by the British Museum.

In 1907, Holiday went to Egypt, painting a series of watercolours and illustrations on ancient Egyptian themes. These were exhibited at Walker's Gallery, London, in March 1908 jointly with Mothersole who had been working on Egyptian archaeological drawings and watercolours since 1903/4. In 1907–08, he commissioned the building of a holiday home, Betty Fold, in his favourite part of the Lake District.

Between 1912 and 1919 he painted the apse of the east end of St Benedict's Church at Small Heath, Birmingham, depicting Christ in Glory with angels, and saints in arcading, below, in Byzantine style.

Holiday had been a socialist throughout his life and, together with his wife Kate and daughter Winifred, supported the Suffragette movement. The family were close acquaintances of Myra Sadd Brown and Emmeline Pankhurst and her daughter, and had organised local suffragette meetings in the Lake District.

Holiday died on 15 April 1927 in London, two years after his wife, Catherine. His nephew, Gilbert Holiday (1879–1937), son of Sir Frederick Holiday, was also an artist who also has paintings in British collections.

== See also ==
- Aestheticism
- British and Irish stained glass (1811–1918)

== Bibliography ==
- Holiday, Henry. Stained glass as an art (1896).
- Holiday, Henry. Art and Individualism (1903)
- Holiday, Henry. Reminiscences of My Life (Heinemann London, 1914).
- Carroll, Lewis. The Hunting of the Snark an Agony, in Eight Fits (London: MacMillan & Co., 1876).
- Various. Famous Paintings, Volume 1 (Cassell, 1891), no. 1.
- Mackay, Angus M. Henry Holiday and his art. Article from The Westminster Review, Volume 158 (1902) pp. 391 ff.
- The decorative work of Mr. Henry Holiday (Studio International, Volume 46, 1909) pp. 106–115.
- Baldry, A. L. Henry Holiday (Walker's quarterly, nos. 31–32, pub. by London: Walker's Galleries, 1930).
- Henry Holiday 1839–1927, exhibition catalogue (London: William Morris Gallery, Walthamstow, 1989).
- Wilcox, Scott & Newall, Christopher. Victorian landscape watercolors (Hudson Hills, 1992) p. 190.
- Cohen, Morton N. & Wakeling, Edward. Lewis Carroll and his illustrators (Macmillan, London, 2003) pp. 22–27.
