= Gal Gadot =

Israeli actress (born 1985)

- גל גדות
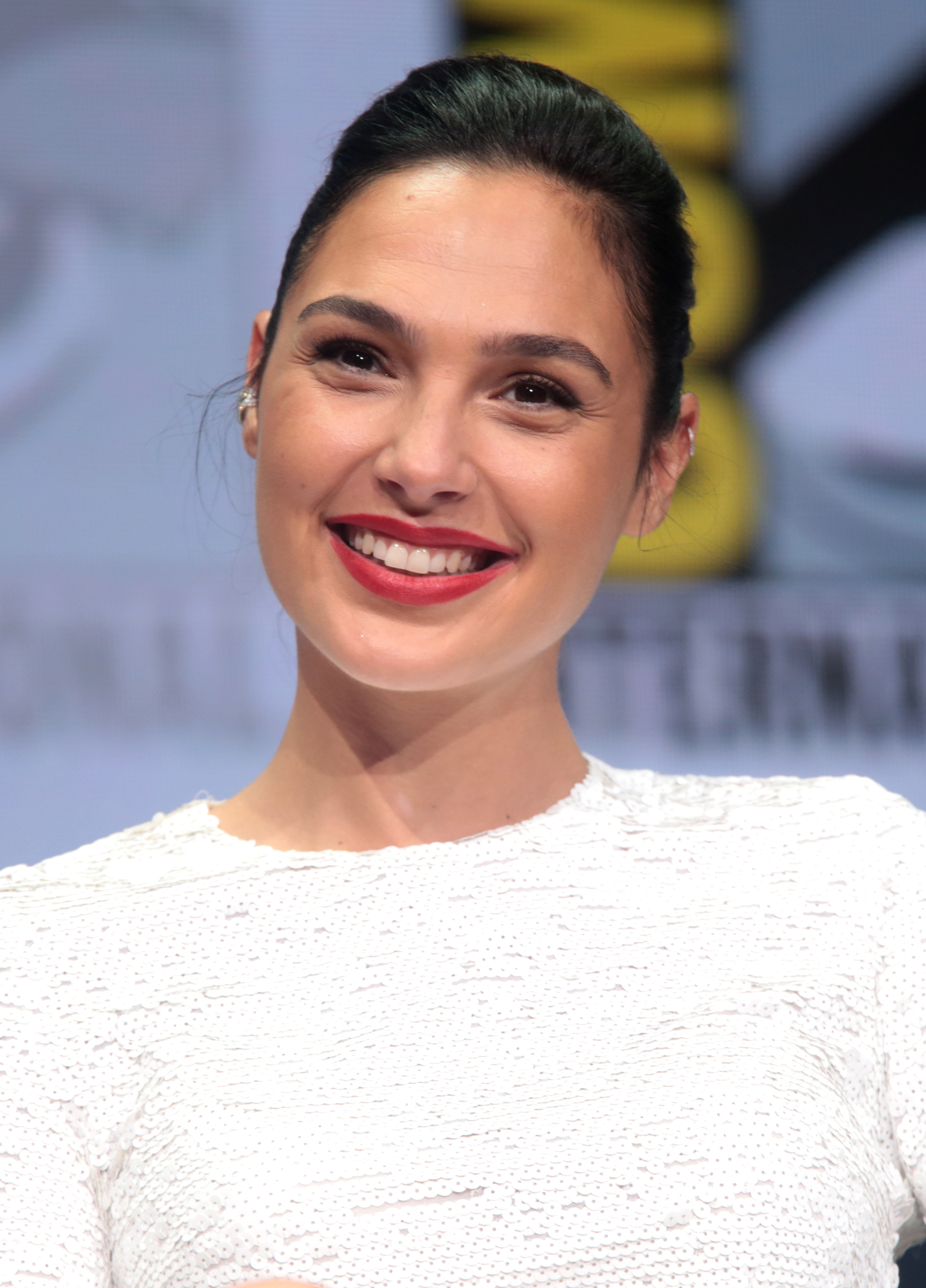
- Gadot at the 2017 San Diego Comic-Con
- Born: 30 April 1985 (age 41); Petah Tikva, Israel
- Occupations: Actress; model
- Years active: 2004–present
- Title: Miss Israel 2004
- Spouse: Jaron Varsano (m. 2008)
- Children: 4

Gal Gadot (Hebrew: גל גדות, pronounced [ˈɡal ɡaˈdot]; born 30 April 1985) is an Israeli actress and model. She gained recognition for portraying Wonder Woman in the DC Extended Universe films (2016–2023). In 2018, Gadot was named one of Time's 100 most influential people in the world and ranked by Forbes as the tenth–highest-paid actress, later rising to third-highest in 2020. In 2025, she became the first Israeli actor to receive a star on the Hollywood Walk of Fame.

Gadot grew up in Rosh HaAyin and first gained attention locally after winning Miss Israel 2004, followed by two years of mandatory service in the Israel Defense Forces (IDF) as a combat trainer. During this time, she participated in a Maxim photo shoot that boosted her public profile, leading her to begin modeling and endorsing various brands. Shortly after, she made her television debut in the Israeli drama Bubot in 2008, followed by her film debut in a supporting role as Gisele Yashar in Fast & Furious (2009), reprising it in multiple sequels (2011–2023). She also appeared on Israeli television in the second season of Asfur (2010–2012) and later in Kathmandu (2012).

Gadot first portrayed Wonder Woman in Batman v Superman: Dawn of Justice (2016). The success of the film led to her starring in Wonder Woman (2017), which became a major box office hit. She reprised the role again in Justice League (2017) and Wonder Woman 1984 (2020), the latter of which she co-produced. Since then, she has starred in Red Notice (2021), Death on the Nile (2022), and Heart of Stone (2023), which she co-produced. In 2025 she portrayed the Evil Queen in Snow White and Gemma Donati in In the Hand of Dante.

Beyond acting, Gadot and her husband have co-founded a film production company, launched a food brand, and invested in Israeli startups. Gadot is widely celebrated in Israel as a national icon and ambassador and has been honored by various Jewish and Zionist organizations for her effect on Israel's image, including the Israeli-American Council (IAC), Anti-Defamation League (ADL), Jerusalem Film Festival, and Hadassah. She has also been awarded a Genesis Prize. Her support for the Israeli military and for hostages held in the Gaza Strip during the ongoing Gaza war has drawn criticism from Palestinian nationalists, anti-Zionists, and others; she has also received criticism from some pro-Israeli nationalists and Zionists who argue she has not shown support strongly enough.

== Early life ==
Gadot was born on 30 April 1985 in Petah Tikva, (Note: Sources vary, though given the evidence, her birthplace is most likely Petah Tikva. Gadot has stated in an English-language interview that she was born in Tel Aviv, though Hebrew-language articles state that she was born in Petah Tikva, and several English-language sources further support this. Some have claimed that she was born in Rosh HaAyin, but Gadot said that she was only raised there.) where she initially lived at Stampfer street. She was born to Jewish parents of Ashkenazi descent; her mother's roots are Czech and Polish, while her father's are Austrian, Russian, and German. Her parents, Michael, an engineer, and Irit, a physical education teacher, Hebraized their surname from "Greenstein" to "Gadot" before her birth. In Hebrew, her first name means "wave", and her Hebrew surname 'Gadot' translates to "riverbanks". She has a younger sister, Dana.

Her father was the sixth-generation of the Land of Israel/Palestine region and is an Israeli-born citizen, and one of his ancestors was the first chemist at Shaare Zedek Hospital in Jerusalem, while her mother is a first-generation Israeli-born citizen and the daughter of Holocaust survivors. Her maternal grandfather, Abraham Weiss, was born as Adolf Weiss, in the village of Munkács, Czechoslovakia in 1928. At thirteen, when Nazi Germany invaded, his father (her great-grandfather) died in the army and Abraham, his mother, and his brother were sent to Auschwitz, where the latter two perished in the gas chamber. Gadot's maternal grandmother, however, managed to escape Europe before World War II. Abraham immigrated alone to Jaffa, where he built a life. He later served in the Golani Brigade; in his later years, Abraham joined Israel Defense Forces (IDF) expeditions to give first-hand testimony about his experiences in Auschwitz.

In 1993, at age eight, Gadot moved with her family to the Givat Tal neighborhood of Rosh HaAyin, where she grew up, in what she described as a "very Jewish, Israeli family environment". As a child, she struggled with a weak voice and attended speech therapy, where she learned proper breathing techniques. Encouraged by her mother to be active from a young age, Gadot took up swimming at four and later played tennis. She joined the local volleyball and basketball teams, soccer-team cheerleader, and trained in ballet, hip-hop, and jazz for twelve years; at one point, she considered a career as a choreographer.

At eleven, Gadot visited Holocaust memorial sites in Poland to learn about Auschwitz and Majdanek. Reflecting on the experience, she recalled: "I, an entitled child, felt the suffering the Muselmann experienced back then." At twelve, she was invited to enter the Girl of the Year (Hebrew: נערת השנה) competition but declined, initially dismissed modeling as a career, but later realized it is a fun job that makes great money and offers exciting experiences.

Although Gadot's native language is Hebrew, she began taking English lessons in third grade; she became fluent after starting to watch the sitcoms Seinfeld and Friends. She later attended Begin High School, where she majored in biology. After graduating, she had a few months before beginning her mandatory two-year service in the IDF. During this time, she received modeling offers but instead chose to work at Burger King, saying, "I was like, posing for money? Ugh, it's not for me." Meanwhile, her mother and a friend submitted an application on her behalf for the Miss Israel pageant. Before enlisting, she also worked as a caregiver for eight-month-old twins.

== Career ==
=== 2004–2009: Miss Israel, IDF service and early work ===
In 2004, Gadot's army enlistment was postponed six months, so her mother encouraged her to enter a beauty pageant. Gadot saw it as a fun opportunity before beginning her service. To her surprise, she won the 54th Miss Israel beauty pageant, which was held at the Haifa Congress Center. She was crowned Miss Israel and received a Citroën C3 supermini car. Following her win, Gadot represented Israel in the Miss Universe 2004 pageant in Ecuador but admitted she intentionally "rebelled" to avoid winning, arriving late to events and refusing to wear an evening gown. During an interview with Ynet, and before giving up her pageant title, Gadot highlighted the value of military service, viewing it as both a duty and a chance for personal growth. In 2005, a week after passing on the crown, Gadot was conscripted into the Israel Defense Forces. After excelling in a three-month boot camp, she went on to serve as a combat trainer, teaching soldiers gymnastics and calisthenics. Reporting daily at 5 a.m., she led soldiers through a form of boot camp. She became so passionate about the techniques she learned that she eventually trained sergeants and high-ranking commanders. Gadot also trained in Krav Maga, and gained proficiency in handling weapons and preparing for combat. She completed her mandatory two-year service, of which only 20 days were in uniform. Reflecting on her military experience in a 2016 interview with Fashion, Gadot said, "It was demanding because you give up your freedom for two years, but there is something special in giving back to your community."

The 2007 Maxim photoshoot titled "Women of the IDF" sparked controversy in Israel and advanced Gadot's career.

In 2007, while still serving, Gadot appeared in Maxim's "Women of the Israel Defense Forces" photo shoot, which was later featured on the cover of the New York Post. The shoot was part of a campaign by Israel's consulate in New York, Maxim, and the Ministry of Tourism to "promote Israel, attract young American men, and reshape its public image". The campaign faced criticism, particularly from Knesset members, over the portrayal of female soldiers in bikinis. Following the criticism, Gadot defended the images, stating that she did not consider them pornographic and dismissed the political criticism, saying she was "not involved in politics". After the photo was featured on the July 2007 cover of the New York Post, the shoot significantly boosted Gadot's public profile; as a result, she landed an international campaign for "Prada Ellis" perfume. That same year, she began pursuing law and international studies at IDC Herzliya (now Reichman University). She attributed this decision to being "so deep", and because she "loved" the legal comedy-drama television series Ally McBeal. She eventually dropped out three times—the first time because of her first acting role.

After her first year at university, a casting director from London contacted Gadot's agent after seeing her modeling card on the agency's wall, which led to an unsuccessful audition for the role of Camille Montes in the James Bond film Quantum of Solace. In a 2017 interview with W Magazine, Gadot said she initially felt "too serious and smart to be an actress" due to her studies and was "uncomfortable" speaking English. Her agent urged her to go "out of respect", and the casting director supported her through several callbacks. Although she lost the Bond role to Olga Kurylenko, Gadot found the experience "interesting" and told her agents to let her know if any other opportunities came up that might be a better fit for her, and two months later, made her acting debut in the Israeli drama Bubot. She recalled that on the first day of university classes, she received a call informing her that she had landed the lead role of Miriam. She later performed in Festigal Underwater, an annual Israeli musical show for kids during Hanukkah, where she performed as a mermaid, acting, singing, and dancing.

Three months after her unsuccessful audition for Quantum of Solace, the same casting director recommended Gadot to Universal Studios and contacted her about a role in Fast & Furious franchise. She was asked to "urgently" send a filmed audition to Los Angeles, which was well received. As a result, the studio flew Gadot and her agent, the CEO of the Look Agency, to LA for a personal meeting with Vin Diesel, who would decide if she got the role. Gadot was ultimately chosen over six other actresses for the supporting role of Gisele Yashar in the fourth film of the franchise.

Reflecting on the audition process, Gadot shared that she worked closely with Israeli coach Orit Shar, preparing thoroughly and building a backstory that impressed director Justin Lin. Filming took about a month. After filming wrapped in 2008, Gadot signed with Endeavor, becoming the only Israeli represented by the agency. Later that year, she signed with ICM agency and One management. After Fast & Furious was released in 2009, Gadot reflected on her success saying, "I can't believe this happened to me..I have more luck than intelligence." The role is considered her big break, earning rave reviews and cementing her status as a "Hollywood mainstay." That same year, she made a brief appearance in the TV series Entourage in the episode titled "Amongst Friends", portraying Lisa, a date of the main character, Vincent Chase. She left due to unwanted and "inappropriate behavior." She later appeared on the American teen drama, The Beautiful Life: TBL.

=== 2010–2016: Breakthrough as Wonder Woman ===
In 2010, Gadot had small roles in the action-adventure comedy Knight and Day, playing Naomi, the date of Tom Cruise’s character, in which she also speaks Hebrew. This was followed by the action comedy Date Night, where she appears briefly as Natanya, the Israeli bedfellow of Mark Wahlberg’s character, Holbrooke; her scenes with Wahlberg were filmed over five days. In 2011, Gadot reprised her role as Gisele in Fast Five. Gadot explained that giving Gisele a Mossad background allowed for character development across multiple films. She believes director Lin valued her Israeli military experience and aimed to use her weapons knowledge in the role. Later that year, she appeared in the second season of the Israeli series Asfur, playing Kiki, a coffee shop owner in Amsterdam. In 2012, she starred the Israeli drama, Kathmandu. Sources in the industry estimate that Gadot earned over NIS3,000 (approximately US$800) per day of filming. In 2013, she returned to the Fast & Furious franchise, reprising her character in Fast & Furious 6, where she performed some of her own stunt work in the film. In November 2013, Variety reported that Gadot, along with other actresses, had tested for the role of Wonder Woman. In December 2013, Gadot was confirmed for the role in the untitled Batman v Superman movie alongside Henry Cavill and Ben Affleck, directed by Zack Snyder. The contract for her portrayal of Wonder Woman was managed by her then-agent, ADD agency, which represented Gadot both in Israel and internationally. She left the agency in 2019 on good terms. Reflecting on her audition for the role in a 2016 Variety interview, Gadot described the process as "super intensive, nerve-racking, a long roller coaster". While in Los Angeles, Warner Bros. invited her to audition for a then undisclosed role with Snyder. Her agent later informed her that she would screen-test opposite Affleck, and she ultimately secured the role, which was revealed to be in Batman v Superman: Dawn of Justice.

Before landing the role, Gadot shared that she had almost quit acting due to frustration with the constant rejection she faced while auditioning in Los Angeles. After several Fast & Furious films and coming close to major parts, including Imperator Furiosa in Mad Max: Fury Road (2015), which ultimately went to Charlize Theron, she considered leaving the profession. She also noted that acting was not a childhood dream but a field she grew curious about and eventually fell in love with. In June 2014, she signed a three-picture deal with Warner Bros. to appear as Wonder Woman, reportedly earning $300,000 per film.

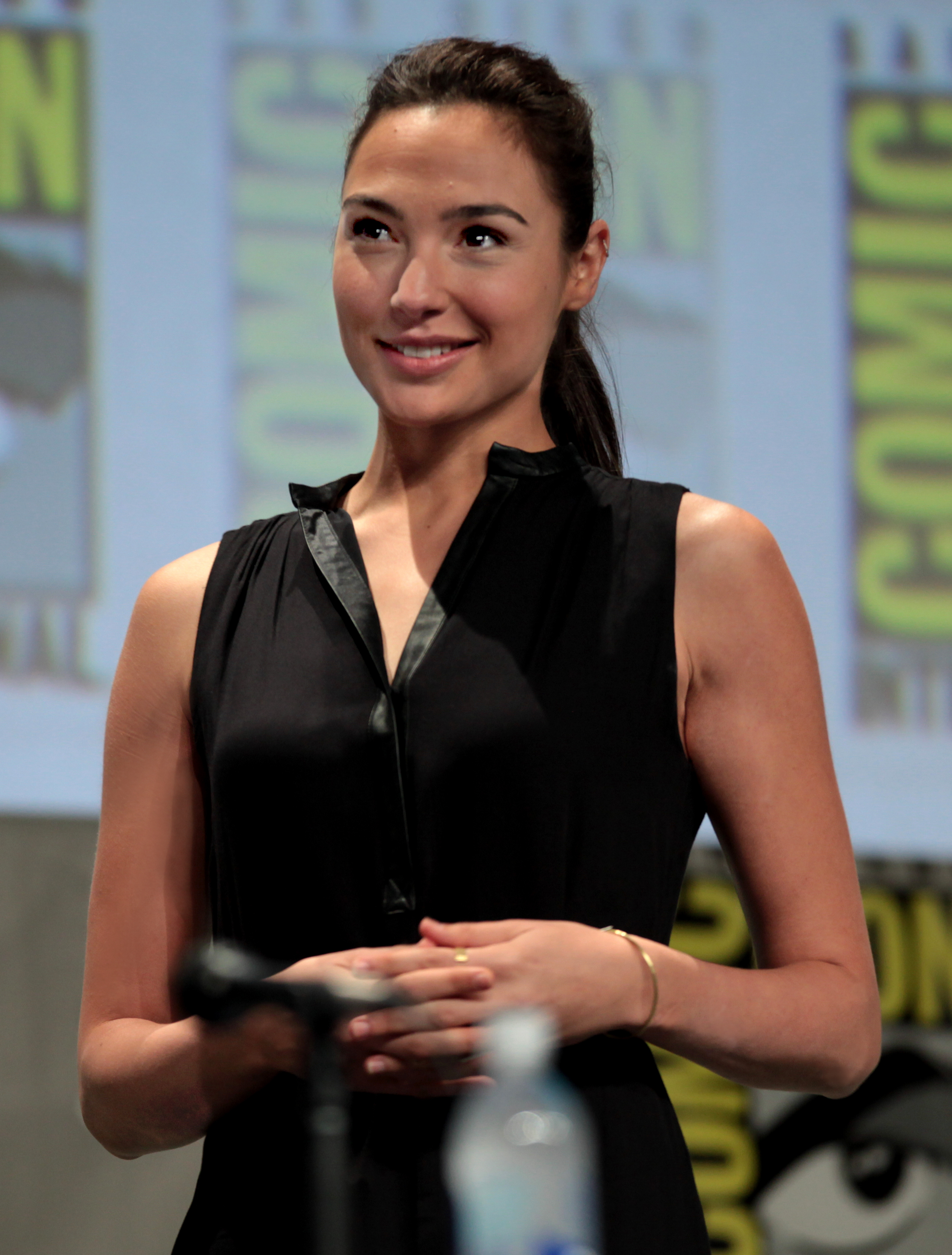
Gadot, speaking at San Diego Comic-Con in July 2014 for Batman v Superman: Dawn of Justice at the San Diego Convention Center.

In July 2014, Gadot's portrayal of Wonder Woman was unveiled at Comic-Con during the Batman v Superman: Dawn of Justice panel. Some critics argued Gadot's Israeli background and slim frame made her unfit to play the part. Gadot dismissed the backlash. Despite prior criticism of her physique, she stated that she had trained to build muscle for the role, moving beyond her previous Fast & Furious image. To prepare, she took lessons in swordsmanship, Kung Fu, kickboxing, capoeira and Brazilian jiu-jitsu, gaining 17 pounds of muscle. She also explained that she "trained six hours a day for six months—two hours of gym work, two hours of fight choreography, and up to two hours of horseback riding. It was much more intense than the army." That same year, Gadot landed her first Israeli film role in the comedy Kicking Out Shoshana, playing lead character Mirit Ben-Harush. Later, in 2016, she was offered the lead role in the Hollywood remake of Ben-Hur (2016) but had to decline due to scheduling conflicts with Batman v Superman.

Prior to her debut as Wonder Woman, Gadot revealed she had previously been offered the role of Faora-Ul in Man of Steel (2013). Gadot turned it down due to her pregnancy; this led to Antje Traue being cast for the role instead. In 2016, Gadot officially debuted as Wonder Woman in the superhero film Batman v Superman: Dawn of Justice. Gadot's performance as the superhero, the character's first film appearance, was singled out by The Guardian as one of the film's best parts. Her portrayal of Wonder Woman quickly became a defining role in her career, with critics praising her for bringing strength, grace, and a refreshing depth to the character. Critics particularly noted how she brought a strong sense of empowerment and integrity to the role, setting a new standard for female superheroes in mainstream cinema.

She then had a small role in John Hillcoat's crime-thriller Triple 9, where she starred along with Kate Winslet and Aaron Paul. Later that year, she co-starred in the action crime thriller film Criminal, as the wife of Ryan Reynolds' character, alongside Kevin Costner, Gary Oldman, and Tommy Lee Jones. She described the film as the most challenging project she had done to date. Her final film of the year was the action comedy Keeping Up with the Joneses, in which she played a secret agent, alongside Zach Galifianakis, Jon Hamm, and Isla Fisher. Critic Alex Welch wrote on IGN about Gadot's performance: "the script unfortunately banks mostly on her looks and deadly skills as a spy for her jokes, but Gadot manages to make it work."

=== 2017–2020: Wonder Woman films ===
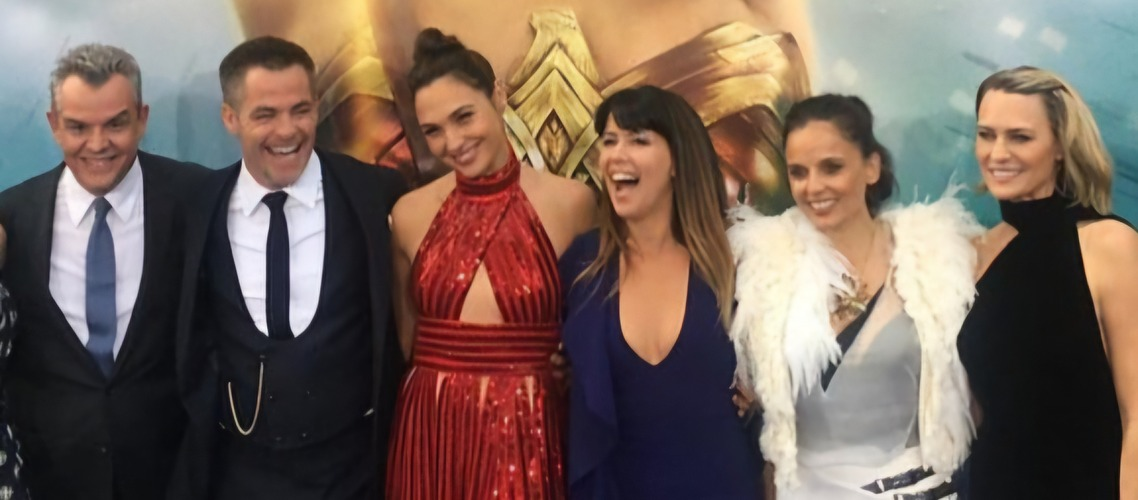
Cast of Wonder Woman at the Los Angeles premiere, from left to right: Danny Huston, Chris Pine, Gadot, director Patty Jenkins, Elena Anaya, and Robin Wright.

In 2017, Gadot starred in a solo film for her character, Wonder Woman, which was paid $300,000. This figure sparked some controversy, as it was significantly lower than the salaries commanded by many male action stars in Hollywood. However, the film received a positive response from critics, with some calling it the best installment in the DC Extended Universe. Praise was directed at Patty Jenkins's direction, the chemistry between Gadot and Chris Pine, the musical score, and the thrilling action sequences. Due to her former service in the IDF, the film has been banned in Lebanon, Kuwait, and Jordan. She then reprised the role in the ensemble film Justice League, which was released in November 2017, and which was her third DC Extended Universe installment. During the film's production under director Joss Whedon, she alleged that Whedon verbally abused her and "threatened" her career. She stated in an interview that she took the matter to the heads of Warner Bros., who "took care of it".

That same year, Gadot was invited to join the Academy of Motion Picture Arts and Sciences. Gadot then voiced the character Shank, who was modeled after her, in the Walt Disney Animation Studios film, Ralph Breaks the Internet (2018). The film's co-director, Phil Johnston, praised Gadot's performance. She then appeared in the music video for Maroon 5's song "Girls Like You" featuring Cardi B. In January 2020, National Geographic announced Impact with Gal Gadot. The six-part documentary series, executive produced by Gadot and her husband, highlights young women overcoming poverty, violence, and discrimination to create positive change in their communities, premiered in April 2021 across National Geographic's digital and social platforms.

Gadot returned as Wonder Woman in Wonder Woman 1984 (2020), for which she reportedly earned $10 million. The sequel to her 2017 solo film was released on 25 December 2020. It was also released on the HBO Max streaming platform due to the COVID-19 pandemic. The Washington Post reported that the response changed from "early praise to precipitous decline". The film received praise for Gadot's performance and the visual effects; however, it garnered mixed reviews from critics, with some finding the plot overly complex and less impactful than the first film. Although a third Wonder Woman film was greenlit on 27 December 2020, it was ultimately cancelled in December 2022, despite Gadot teasing development plans through 2023.

=== 2021–present: Streaming projects ===
In November 2021, Gadot starred alongside Dwayne Johnson and Ryan Reynolds in the Netflix action comedy film Red Notice, written and directed by Rawson Marshall Thurber. The Guardian, in its review, opined that Gadot was "sleepwalking through the motions" and was "adept only when fighting". The film became Netflix's most-watched title ever at the time, according to Bloomberg. The film has over 328 million hours streamed in its first three weeks. This equates to 164 million accounts watching it in full, making it the most-watched new movie of 2021.

The following year, she co-starred with Kenneth Branagh, Tom Bateman, and Annette Bening in the 2022 mystery film Death on the Nile, which was also directed by Branagh. Los Angeles Times' chief film critic Justin Chang deemed her "underwhelming" in the film, while The Week's Jesse Hassenger defended Gadot's performance addressing the widespread criticism she received for her portrayal of Linnet Doyle, particularly for a meme-worthy line delivery. The film was banned in Tunisia following protests over Gadot's Israeli military service and her support for Israel's 2014 Gaza offensive. This decision, followed by bans in Kuwait and Lebanon, reflects longstanding support for the Palestinian cause.

In 2023, Gadot made uncredited cameo appearances, her two final outings, as Wonder Woman in Shazam! Fury of the Gods and The Flash. She also returned to the Fast & Furious franchise with a cameo appearance in Fast X. Later that year, she was offered the role of Barbie in Barbie, but she was unavailable. Later that year, she played the lead role of a double agent in Netflix's action film Heart of Stone. This film is Gadot and her husband's first project developed and produced through their company, Pilot Wave, which they began developing in 2018. She called it an "extremely empowering and educational experience". The film however, received mostly negative reviews, with Owen Gleiberman stating: "Gadot is game, but there's a slightly downbeat earnestness about her that doesn't mesh with the reflexive quippiness of the dialogue." Despite negative reception, the film emerged as Netflix's second-most-watched film in late 2023, with nearly 110 million views.

Gadot next starred as the Evil Queen in a live-action adaptation of Disney's 1937 animated film Snow White and the Seven Dwarfs. In an interview with GQ, she said Disney needed to confirm she could sing, so she spent a month preparing before auditioning and landing the role. She also had her own personal dialect coach for the role. In August 2024, calls from pro-Palestinian activists to boycott Disney's Snow White remake emerged due to Gadot's support for Israel. In March 2025, it was reported that Disney assigned bodyguards to Gadot after she received death threats linked to co-star Rachel Zegler's "Free Palestine" post during Snow White's promotional campaign. Gadot's performance in the film was polarizing; some felt it showcased her potential as a villain, while others argued she lacked the charisma and menace needed for the role. Her rendition of the song "All Is Fair" drew particular criticism for its awkward delivery and lack of vocal strength, which undercut the intended impact of the character. In response to the criticism she received for the film, Gadot stated in an interview that audiences primarily saw her as an Israeli rather than as an actress. She further added that the film's lack of success was due to the "pressure on celebrities to speak out against Israel."

Also in 2025, Gadot appeared in Julian Schnabel’s film In the Hand of Dante as Gemma Donati, alongside Oscar Isaac as Nick Tosches / Dante Alighieri and other lead actors. Based on Tosches’ novel, the film moves between 14th- and 21st-century Italy and follows the discovery of a handwritten manuscript of Dante’s The Divine Comedy that travels from the Vatican to the New York underworld. The film first premiered on 3 September 2025, at the Venice Film Festival. Gadot’s appearance in the film sparked calls for a boycott, in response, Schnabel stated at that he chose the actors for their merits and that they did "an extraordinary job," adding that he sees no reason to boycott artists for their pro-Israel stances. When asked about casting Gadot, the director stated that he spoke to her on the phone and conducted screen tests, after which he believed she could perform the role. He also commented that in the film, Gadot's character reminded him of Ingrid Bergman and described her interactions with co-star Isaac as "warm and embracing".

She then starred as the lead alongside Damian Lewis in the thriller, The Runner. directed by Kevin Macdonald. Production on the film was disrupted when pro-Palestine protesters stormed the London set. Gadot and the production company brought a case against them based on a little-used trade union law. Gadot is set to star alongside Matthias Schoenaerts in Ruin, a post-WWII revenge thriller. The story follows a recently released concentration camp prisoner (Gadot) who forms an unlikely alliance with a former German soldier (Schoenaerts) as they seek vengeance on a Nazi SS squad. The film is directed by Niki Caro.

== Other endeavors ==
=== Endorsements and modeling ===
Before enlisting in the Israeli army, she worked briefly as a model in Milan. She then returned to Israel and continued modeling while serving in the military. In 2007, following the Maxim "Women of the Israel Defense Forces" photoshoot, Gadot's public image gained significant attention, leading her to promote various products, appear in numerous advertisements, and was featured in several magazines. She first landed an international campaign for Prada Ellis perfume. She then became a spokesmodel for the Israeli clothing brand Castro, a role she held for over 11 seasons, reportedly earning about $100,000 per season. In 2010, Gadot walked the runway for Castro's collection and continued modeling for the brand regularly through 2015.

In 2013, Castro CEO Gabi Rotter noted that Gadot was not widely known when she was chosen but was the "perfect fit to represent Israeli beauty". He cited her background as both an IDF soldier and a beauty pageant contestant as key factors in her selection. In 2013, Gadot signed a two-year deal with skincare brand Carline. According to Ofer Yaar from the advertising agency Bruckner Neta Yaar, Gadot was selected as the spokesmodel because she embodies the brand's values, being "local and international, she exudes simplicity and accessibility, and she is your best friend, even when she is Wonder Woman." In 2015 she became the face of Gucci Bamboo. In 2018, Reebok announced an endorsement deal with Gadot, reported to be worth $10 million (NIS 34 million). She also became a brand ambassador for Huawei, which led to controversy after she tweeted a promotional video using an Apple device. Gadot explained that the mistake was made by a member of her publicity team, who incorrectly posted the video from the wrong phone.

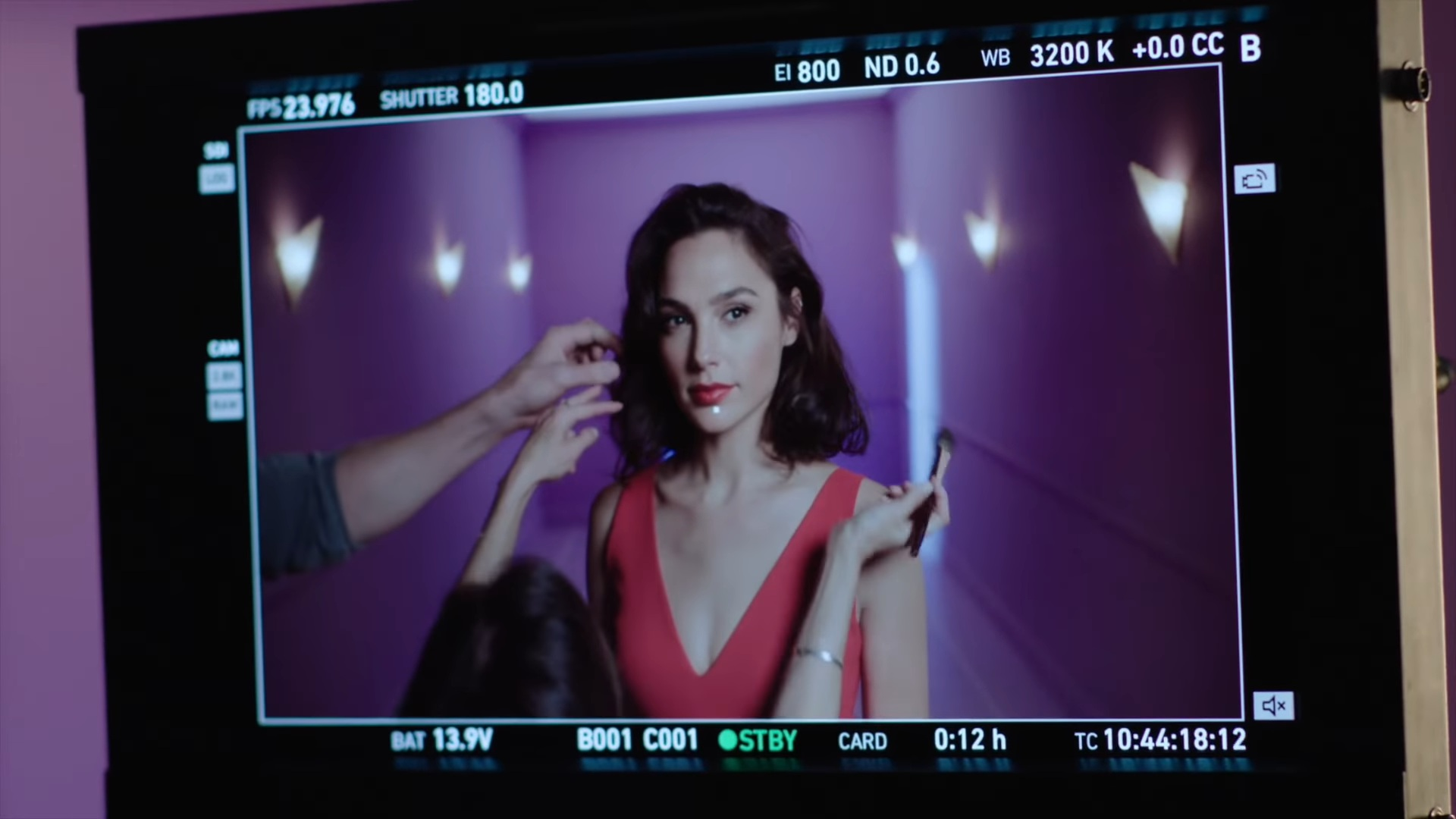
Gadot behind the scenes of Revlon's "Live Boldly" campaign

In 2018, Revlon named Gadot its global ambassador for its "Live Boldly" campaign. The brand executives praised Gadot as a symbol of "strength, beauty, and empowerment," with Fabian Garcia, Revlon's president & CEO, emphasized that Gadot represents "the beauty, determination and attitude that reflect what it is for women to live boldly in today's world". However, her modeling contract for Revlon drew criticism, notably from Muslim blogger Amani Al-Khatahtbeh, who rejected a Revlon award because of Gadot's support for the IDF.

In 2019, Gadot starred in commercials alongside Hot's popular stars, promoting the brand's "Israeli pride" campaign. Hot CEO Tal Granot-Goldstein described her as the perfect fit, embodying the essence of "Israeliness" for the new campaign. In 2021, she became the brand ambassador for Smartwater, a division of Coca-Cola. In April 2023, Gadot became the new ambassador of Tiffany & Co., and was honored to cut the ribbon at the brand's upgraded and remodeled Fifth Avenue store in New York.

=== Production ventures ===
Gadot's husband and his brother owned a boutique hotel in Neve Tzedek, Tel Aviv, called the Varsano Hotel. In 2015, it was sold to Russian oligarch and politician Roman Abramovich for INS 100 million (approximately $26 million). In October 2019, Gadot formed a film and television production company, Pilot Wave, with her husband Jaron "Yaron" Varsano. Reflecting on the decision, Gadot stated in a 2023 interview with L'Oréal that it was to have greater control over her career, noting that she does not prefer to wait for opportunities to come to her. Since then, she has shared teasers for different projects—some got mixed reactions, but none have been released. In November 2021, the couple launched Goodles, a mac and cheese brand co-founded with "experienced partners" like former Kraft brand executive Paul Earle, with the goal of offering a healthier alternative to traditional boxed mac and cheese. In 2022, the couple invested in Safe School, an Israeli startup founded by Doron Herman, which provides educational content focused on social issues for children and teenagers. This investment is part of their ongoing support for Israeli startups, following a previous investment in K Health.

== Reception ==
=== Media reception ===
Gadot faced early criticism for her slim physique during her pageant years in 2004, with some speculating about eating disorders, claims she dismissed as rooted in unrealistic beauty standards. Ynet noted Gadot was once seen as a "shelf product", struggling to break into local fashion. Photographer Alon Shefransky called her transformation from a "baby-faced look" to a more defined presence a "wow moment," comparing it to discovering "the next Natalie Portman". By 2012, Gadot ranked second on Forbes Israel's list of top-earning models, with earnings of NIS 1.3 million (approximately US$350,000), and in 2013, her earnings rose to NIS2.4 million (approximately US$650,000), driven largely by brand endorsements and her role in Fast & Furious. In 2015, Forbes Israel ranked her 49th on their list of "The Most Powerful Women in Israel" and 38th on their list of "Influential Women".

Ahead of Wonder Woman's 2017 release, Gadot received 95% positive online comments, with Taykey analytics ranking her as the most beloved Israeli globally. The company CEO, Amit Avner, noted that Gadot had already been the most talked-about personality during Super Bowl commercials, one of which she appeared in earlier that year. However, the release of Wonder Woman would elevated her popularity further. That same year Forbes Israel ranked her 35th on their list of "Influential Women", and ranked 53rd on Forbes "30 Under 30 list". Additionally, she topped FHM's "100 Sexiest Women in the World" list. That same year, she became the third highest-grossing actress of 2017.

In her January 2018 piece, The Forward staff writer Jenny Singer critiques how Gadot is portrayed in the media, particularly on the cover of Vanity Fair. Despite Gadot's "success as an actress, activist, and athlete", Singer argues that Gadot is often reduced to a sex object, with her talents overshadowed by her physical appearance. Singer suggests that Gadot's background, including her modeling past and accent, may contribute to the media's focus on her looks rather than her accomplishments. That year, Time magazine named Gadot one of the 100 most influential people in the world, and Forbes ranked her as the tenth highest-paid actress in the world, with annual earnings of $10 million. In 2020, Forbes ranked Gadot as the third highest-paid actress in the world, with annual earnings of $31.5 million. In 2022, Variety reported that Gadot earned $5 million for her role in Death on the Nile, making her the film's highest-paid star.

=== Cultural reception ===
In her honor, the Azrieli Center in Tel Aviv was illuminated on 1 June 2017, ahead of the Israeli premiere of Wonder Woman. The towers displayed the message: "We are proud of you, Gal Gadot, our Wonder Woman." As reported by CBC News, Gadot's portrayal of Wonder Woman has made her "the world's most famous Israeli and the country's most high-profile ambassador". She has been compared to Israeli model Bar Refaeli, who faced backlash in Israel for not serving in the military, while Gadot's own service has endeared her to Israelis. Gadot image as a "good Israeli" and her appearance in Wonder Woman have made her a source of "national Israeli pride". In a 2017 Mako article, Neta Hotar noted that Gadot had become one of Israel's most successful exports, surpassing Jonah Lotan's recognition from CSI, crediting her success to her accessibility, her experience as a media trainee, and her association with a major brand like Wonder Woman, a character strongly associated with American symbols and patriotism, which Hotar also sees as reflecting Israeli pride, showing "how nationalism can reflect female empowerment."

In 2017, Isabel Feinstein of The Jerusalem Post praised Gadot as a powerful example of "soft power" for Israel, highlighting how her rise to global fame offers the "Jewish state" a unique opportunity for positive international exposure. Feinstein highlighted that Gadot's Google search results (20.7 million) surpassed those of Prime Minister Benjamin Netanyahu (16.1 million), emphasizing her global influence. She also noted that Gadot's appearances on Western talk shows like The Tonight Show Starring Jimmy Fallon and The Ellen DeGeneres Show have helped humanize the stereotype of the "brutal Israeli soldier", making her relatable to a worldwide audience. Feinstein went on to describe Gadot as "a living contradiction", claiming that "the association of an Israeli actress with a progressive agenda helps those who unfairly condemn all citizens of a nation for the actions of their government see that Israelis are complex and open-minded humans with a wide range of opinions". In a 2019 article by The Australian Jewish News, it is highlighted that Gadot is often seen as a more effective ambassador for Israel than its diplomats, given her global fame. Ari Ingel of the pro-Israeli Creative Community for Peace believes her interactions with prominent Hollywood figures can positively influence Israel's image. However, Shayna Weiss, of the Schusterman Centre for Israel Studies at Brandeis University, views this as a "soft power" issue—using culture to sway opinions—and questions whether such influence has measurable effects, saying "I don't think Gal Gadot harms Israel, but do I think Gal Gadot helps Israel much? Not so sure."

The release of the film Wonder Woman sparked a debate about Gadot's Jewish identity and her portrayal as a woman of color. Some argued that as an Israeli Ashkenazi Jew, Gadot should not be considered straightforwardly white in the context of Hollywood's historically limited representation of diverse racial identities. Others, including some Jews of color, argued that Gadot is white, and thus while Wonder Woman was a breakthrough for white women, it still lacked representation for women of color. Others, including Tamar Herman, viewed Gadot's role as a positive step toward broader representation, especially for Jewish women, who are often underrepresented or stereotyped in Hollywood, and further highlighting Gadot's Israeli heritage, distinct accent, and strength as a heroic figure. Arielle Iniko Newton, writing for Essence, argued that Black women's support for the film ignored Gadot's ties to the IDF and her connection to the oppression of Palestinians. Salam Al-Mahadin, writing for Duke University's Journal of Middle East Women's Studies, objected not to Gadot's whiteness but to "her status as an enthusiastic Israeli soldier and citizen and the film's valorization of US imperial militarism."

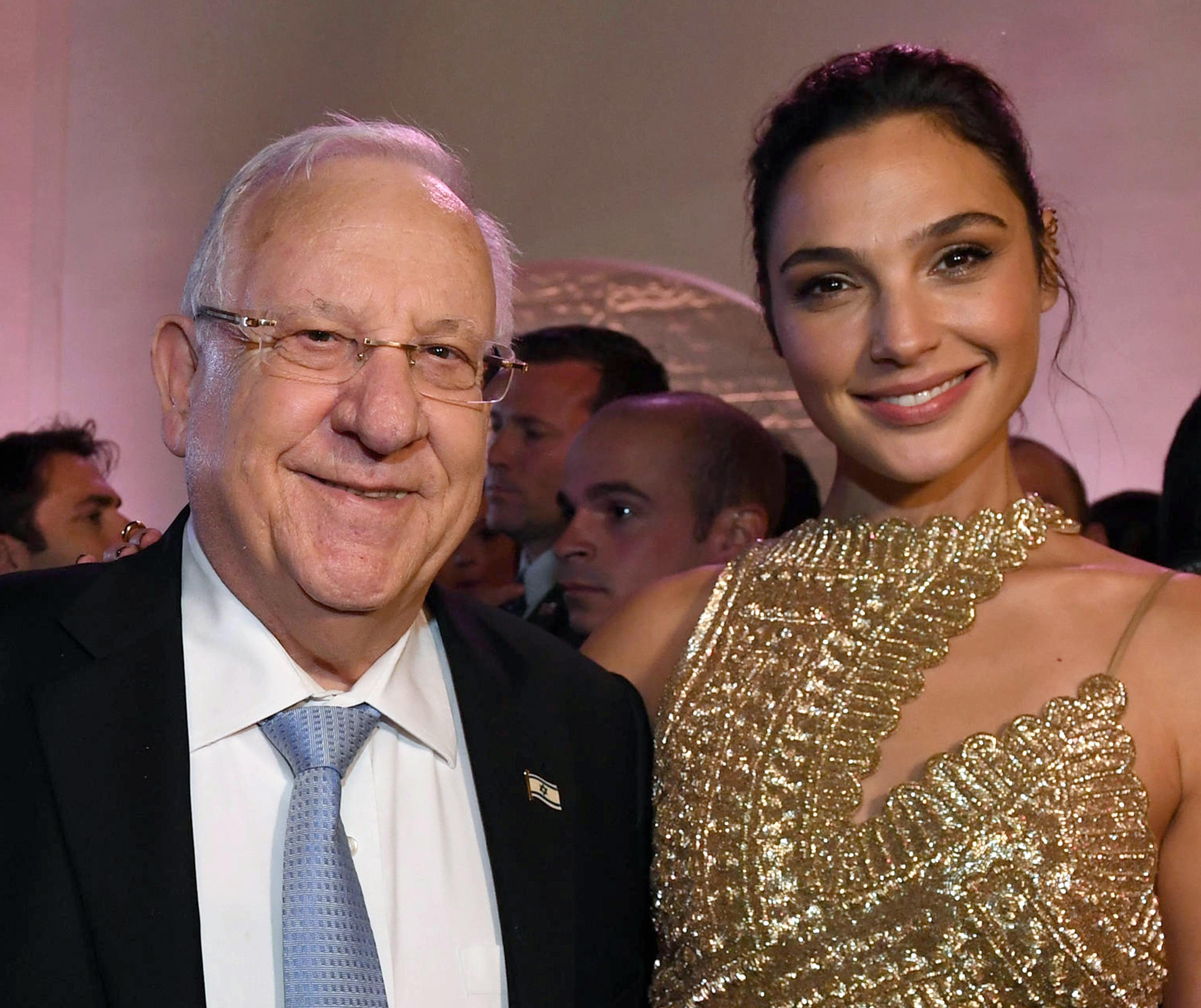
President Reuven Rivlin with Gadot at the Justice League (2017) premiere at the Dolby Theater in Los Angeles.

During his visit to Los Angeles in 2017 for the General Assembly of the Jewish Federations, then-President of Israel Reuven Rivlin was invited by Gadot to the premiere of Justice League. Rivlin embraced Gadot, expressing his pride in her as a "true ambassador [of Israel], who has managed to place us [Israeli] at the pinnacles of global filmmaking with grace, values, and an Israeli smile."

In June 2018, amid boycott of Gadot by Arab countries in the Middle East, a cinema in the northern Israeli town of Nazareth Illit was named "Gal Cinema" in her honor. The two-screen cinema opened with the film Shelter by Israeli director Eran Riklis. Municipal spokeswoman Orna Yosef said the name was "a message for our young people because Gal Gadot is an example of success, who has shown that dreams can be attained". On 7 November 2022, Gadot was honored at the Israeli Culture & Arts Awards by the America-Israel Cultural Foundation (AICF), in recognition of her contributions to film.

In May 2023, Gadot received the Los Angeles Israel Award for Entertainment for "extraordinary achievements" at an event celebrating Israel's 75th Independence Day in Los Angeles, organized by the Israeli-American Council and the Consulate General of Israel in LA, Hillel Newman. In her speech, Gadot expressed pride in her Israeli heritage and emphasized the importance of "strengthening the historic bonds between the United States and Israel".

In June 2023, it was announced that Gadot would become the first Israeli actor to receive a star on the Hollywood Walk of Fame. This was met with criticism, and by 18 March 2025, she officially received it. The ceremony was disrupted by both pro-Palestinian and pro-Israeli protesters, with signs reading "Snow White supports genocide" and "standing with Israel". The star was reportedly vandalized.

In January 2025 Dudi Caspi, Israel's representative to the Golden Globes Association, spoke with Iris Cole on 103FM radio about the ceremony, prasing Gadot as "a good ambassador for Israel". Caspi noted that although Gadot did not wear a hostages pin at the event, she remains an important figure for Israel in Hollywood. In March 2025, the Anti-Defamation League (ADL) presented Gadot with their International Leadership Award, for "her fearless and outspoken advocacy against antisemitism and hate, as well as her unwavering support for Israel and Jewish communities worldwide".

In July 2025, at the Jerusalem Film Festival, Gadot received two awards: one from the Festival for her contributions to international cinema and her success over two decades of work, and another from Hadassah for "her unwavering and courageous support of Israel and for using her global platform to promote truth and justice on behalf of Israel." Festival director Roni Mahadev-Levin credited Gadot as "an actress who turned the Israeli dream into a global reality," adding that she is "a leading figure in world cinema who opened doors for Israeli creators around the globe and raised international awareness of Israeli culture." Hadassah president Carol Ann Schwartz and chairwoman Dalia Itzik stated that Gadot was an obvious choice for the award, which had previously been presented to actress Gwyneth Paltrow, with Schwartz saying, "Choosing Gadot was natural — she is a trailblazing woman who serves as an ambassador of Israel and the Jewish people wherever she goes." Gadot has one of the most followed Israeli Twitter accounts. In September 2025, The Jerusalem Post included her on their list of "50 Most Influential Jews", ranked 45th in a group entry of "seven pro-Israel influencers". She received the 2026 Genesis Prize for her support for of country during the Gaza war and stated that she would donate her $1 million prize to organizations that "help Israelis heal, rebuild, and recover after October 7".

== Advocacy ==
Gadot identifies as a feminist and promotes women's empowerment. In July 2016, Gadot joined a campaign by Israeli female master's students in communications to rebrand Israel by highlighting its strong women. Titled "Israel Creates Wonder Women," it spotlighted real "Israeli heroines" in different fields to promote female empowerment. Gadot supported the initiative after the students reached out to her.

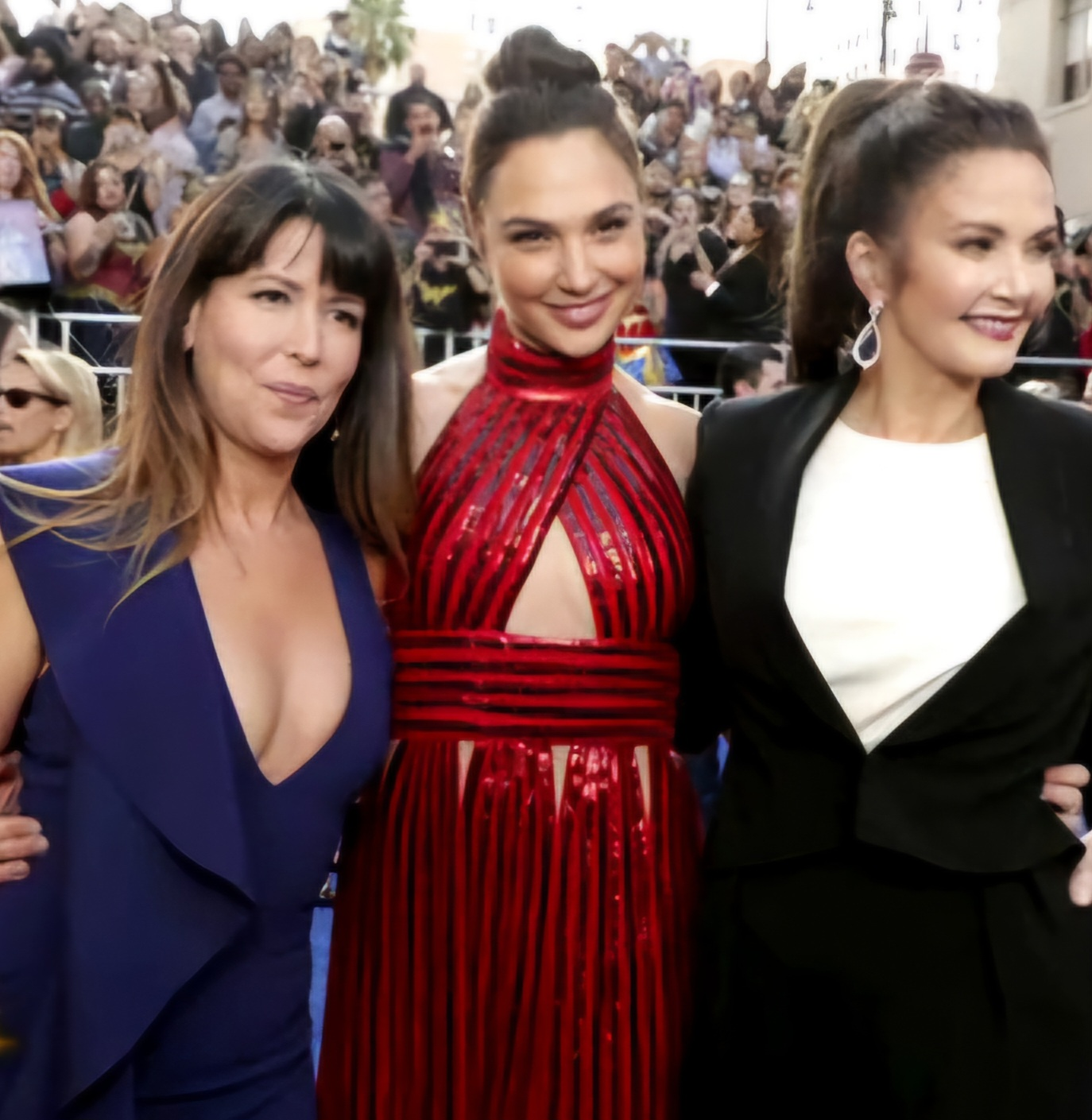
Left to right: Patty Jenkins, Gadot, and Lynda Carter in 2017

Later, in 2016, Gadot, fellow Wonder Woman actress Lynda Carter, DC Entertainment President Diane Nelson, director Patty Jenkins and U.N. Under-Secretary-General Cristina Gallach appeared at the United Nations on 21 October 2016, the 75th anniversary of the first appearance of Wonder Woman, to mark the character's designation by the United Nations as its "Honorary Ambassador for the Empowerment of Women and Girls". The gesture was intended to raise awareness of UN Sustainable Development Goal No. 5, which seeks to achieve gender equality and empower all women and girls by 2030. The decision was met with protests from UN staff members who stated in their petition to UN Secretary-General Ban Ki-moon that the character is "not culturally encompassing or sensitive" and served to objectify women. As a result, the character was stripped of the designation, and the project ended on 16 December.

=== Views on Israel ===
Gadot has been described by the media as outspoken in her support for Israel. Israel Hayom characterized her transition from being "face of a brand or movie to being the face of a country at war" as a personal battle, placing her at the center of public diplomacy as the country's de facto "ambassador", noting that in Israel, she has been criticized for "political softness", while in Hollywood she has been accused of excessive nationalism.

During the 2014 Gaza War, Gadot posted on Facebook a picture of herself and her daughter praying in front of Shabbat candles for Israeli citizens and soldiers, and condemned Hamas as "cowards" who are "hiding behind women and children". In 2019, Gadot clashed with Israeli prime minister Benjamin Netanyahu over the status of Israel's Arab minority after Netanyahu's remark that Israel is a "nation-state" for Jews only. Responding to actress Rotem Sela’s call for equality for all citizens, Gadot supported her, saying it's about "peace, equality, and tolerance."

During the 2021 Israel–Palestine crisis, Gadot initially stayed silent, which led to criticism from Israeli and Jewish media. Gadot later called for peace in a statement that sparked widespread backlash. While expressing support for Israel, she referred to Palestinians as "neighbors" rather than naming them directly, which many saw as downplaying their suffering. Israeli nationalists also expressed disappointment, believing she should have used her global influence to defend Israel more strongly.

In 2022, following several attacks, including the Bnei Brak and Tel Aviv shooting attacks, Gadot faced criticism from Israeli media and fans for staying silent. In October 2023, during the Gaza war, Gadot posted a story on her Instagram stating, "Killing innocent Palestinians is horrific", alongside condemning the killing of Israelis. This led to criticism from some in Israel, accusing her of equating both sides. In response, Gadot later emphasized, "Killing innocent Israelis is horrific," and deleted the mention of Palestinians following further criticism. Gadot, along with over 700 Hollywood professionals, signed an open letter condemning the Palestinian militant group Hamas, demanding the release of hostages, and expressing support for Israel. In November, Gadot organized a screening of Bearing Witness, a film showing Hamas violence, though she did not attend. The screening drew criticism from Jewish Voice for Peace, which called the film "propaganda" and accused Gadot and director Guy Nattiv of overlooking the Palestinian perspective and promoting a pro-war agenda.

In May 2024, Gadot publicly supported Eden Golan, Israel's representative in that year's Eurovision Song Contest, encouraging her followers to vote for Golan. As a result, Gadot lost a million Instagram followers. Despite the backlash, Gadot continued to share posts praising Golan and urging votes throughout the competition. In September 2024, Gadot joined Israeli president Isaac Herzog in launching the "Voice of the People" initiative, aimed at fostering global Jewish unity amidst rising antisemitism and the "ongoing hostage crisis".

== Personal life ==
In 2020, Gadot purchased a penthouse in a gated community in Malibu, from former Miss Universe Bui Simon. The property is reportedly worth around $5 million. Despite having stated that she does not believe in God and is not a "religiously observant" person, she performs the Modeh Ani prayer, and has described how attending a synagogue in Los Angeles soon after October 7 attacks helped her feel the embrace of the Jewish community.

=== Relationships and family ===
In 2006, Gadot was briefly linked to Israeli swimmer Eithan Urbach. That same year, Gadot met her future husband, Jaron "Yaron" Varsano, (Note: While some sources have reported the spelling of her husband's name as "Yaron" and others as "Jaron", he personally uses "Jaron" on his social media accounts and in the production company the couple started.) a real estate developer from Amsterdam who grew up in a Jewish family in the Netherlands, while she was still serving in the Israeli Army. The couple connected at a "chakra/yoga retreat type of party" in the Negev.

In 2008, during a weekend off from filming Fast & Furious 4, the couple went to Napa Valley, where Varsano proposed to Gadot. Later that year, on 28 September, they married at the David Intercontinental Hotel in Israel. They reside in the Neve Tzedek neighborhood of Tel Aviv, and have four daughters, Alma born 5 November 2011, Maya born 20 March 2017, Daniella born 29 June 2021, and Ori, born 5 February 2024.

=== Health ===
In a 2023 interview with L'Officiel, Gadot talked about her struggles with impostor syndrome, often doubting how her work would be received. On 5 February 2024, during her eighth month of pregnancy with her fourth daughter, Ori, Gadot was diagnosed with cerebral venous thrombosis, a rare type of stroke that accounts for less than 3% of all strokes, after suffering from an intense headache. At the hospital, her pregnancy was induced and she gave birth before undergoing emergency surgery within hours. A year after, Gadot told Harper's Bazaar that the near-death experience made her more grateful and present in her life, reminding herself daily to slow down and go at her own pace. She also went public with the experience to help raise awareness.

=== Influences ===
Gadot has expressed admiration for Penélope Cruz, particularly for her courage, individuality, and confidence in embracing her identity. She appreciates how Cruz "stands up for herself and has something to say—she has her own spice, which I love. She is very courageous and also has an accent, but she just goes with it." She also recognizes Yafa Yarkoni as her "Israeli cultural hero", referring to her as "the singer of wars". Additionally, when asked which historical event she would hypothetically like to witness, Gadot shared that she would have chosen the pro-Oslo Accords rally Yitzhak Rabin attended right before he was assassinated.

== Filmography ==
=== Film ===
Key
†	Denotes films that have not yet been released

Year	Title	Role	Notes	Ref.
2009	Fast & Furious	Gisele Yashar		
2010	Date Night	Natanya		
2010	Knight and Day	Naomi		
2011	Fast Five	Gisele Yashar		
2013	Fast & Furious 6	Gisele Yashar		
2014	Kicking Out Shoshana	Mirit Ben Hatush		
2015	Furious 7	Gisele Yashar	Credited and appears in a deleted scene	
2016	Triple 9	Elena Vlaslov		
2016	Batman v Superman: Dawn of Justice	Diana Prince / Wonder Woman		
2016	Criminal	Jill Pope		
2016	Keeping Up with the Joneses	Natalie Jones		
2017	Wonder Woman	Diana Prince / Wonder Woman		
2017	Justice League	Diana Prince / Wonder Woman		
2018	Ralph Breaks the Internet	Shank (voice)		
2019	Between Two Ferns: The Movie	Herself	Cameo	
2020	Wonder Woman 1984	Diana Prince / Wonder Woman	Also producer	
2021	Zack Snyder's Justice League	Diana Prince / Wonder Woman	Director's cut	
2021	Red Notice	Sarah Black / The Bishop		
2022	Death on the Nile	Linnet "Linnie" Ridgeway-Doyle		
2023	Fast X	Gisele Yashar	Uncredited cameo; post-credits scene	
2023	Shazam! Fury of the Gods	Diana Prince / Wonder Woman	Uncredited cameo	
2023	The Flash	Diana Prince / Wonder Woman	Uncredited cameo	
2023	Heart of Stone	Rachel Stone	Also producer	
2025	Snow White	Evil Queen		
2025	In the Hand of Dante	Giulietta Tosches / Gemma Donati		
2026	The Runner	Maia Marten		
TBA	Bitcoin †	Charlotte "Lotte" Miller	Post-production	

=== Television ===
Year	Title	Role	Notes	Ref.
1999	Shemesh	Dancer	Uncredited episode, "Imperyat HaHushim"	
2007	Bubot	Miriam "Merry" Elkayam		
2009	The Beautiful Life	Olivia	3 episodes	
2009	Entourage	Lisa	Episode: "Amongst Friends"	
2011	Asfur	Kika	17 episodes	
2012	Kathmandu	Yamit Bareli	Miniseries	
2013	DocuCeleb	Herself	Television documentary	
2017	Saturday Night Live	Herself	Episode: "Gal Gadot/Sam Smith"	
2017	Saturday Night Live: Cut for Time	Girl Who Ate The Last Fry	Host, Episode: "The Last Fry"	
2018	The Simpsons	Herself	Voice; episode: "Bart's Not Dead"	
2021	Impact with Gal Gadot	Herself	Also executive producer	
2026	HaPshuta	Herself	Guest appearance at the final.	

=== Music videos ===
Year	Title	Artist(s)	Role	Ref.
2018	"Girls Like You" (Original, Volume 2 and Vertical Video versions)	Maroon 5 featuring Cardi B	Herself	
2020	"Imagine"	Gal Gadot & Friends	Herself	
2023	"Quiet"	Noga Erez	Rachel Stone	

== Awards and nominations ==
Year	Award	Category	Nominated work	Result	Ref.
2016	Critics' Choice Awards	Best Actress in an Action Movie	Batman v Superman: Dawn of Justice	Nominated	
2016	Teen Choice Awards	Choice Movie: Breakout Star	Batman v Superman: Dawn of Justice	Nominated	
2016	Teen Choice Awards	Choice Movie: Scene Stealer	Batman v Superman: Dawn of Justice	Nominated	
2016	Women Film Critics Circle Awards	Best Female Action Hero	Batman v Superman: Dawn of Justice	Nominated	
2017	Detroit Film Critics Society	Breakthrough	Wonder Woman	Nominated	
2017	National Board of Review Awards	Spotlight Award	Wonder Woman	Won	
2017	Digital Spy Reader Awards	Best Actress	Wonder Woman	Won	
2017	Women Film Critics Circle Awards	Best Female Action Hero	Wonder Woman	Won	
2017	Teen Choice Awards	Choice Liplock (shared with Chris Pine)	Wonder Woman	Nominated	
2017	Teen Choice Awards	Choice Movie: Action Actress	Wonder Woman	Won	
2017	Teen Choice Awards	Choice Movie: Actress Summer	Wonder Woman	Nominated	
2017	Teen Choice Awards	Choice Movie: Comedy Actress	Keeping Up with the Joneses	Nominated	
2017	Teen Choice Awards	Choice Movie: Ship (shared with Chris Pine)	Wonder Woman	Nominated	
2018	Critics' Choice Awards	#SeeHer Award	Diana Prince/Wonder Woman	Won	
2018	Jupiter Award	Best International Actress	Wonder Woman	Won	
2018	MTV Movie & TV Awards	Best Fight (Wonder Woman vs German soldiers)	Wonder Woman	Won	
2018	MTV Movie & TV Awards	Best Hero	Wonder Woman	Nominated	
2018	Saturn Awards	Best Actress	Wonder Woman	Won	
2018	Shorty Awards	Best Actor	—N/a	Nominated	
2018	Teen Choice Awards	Choice Movie Actress: Action	Justice League	Nominated	
2018	Kids' Choice Awards	Favorite Movie Actress	Justice League	Nominated	
2018	Kids' Choice Awards	Favorite Superhero	Wonder Woman	Nominated	
2018	Empire Awards	Best Actress	Wonder Woman	Nominated	
2019	Kids' Choice Awards	Favorite Female Voice from an Animated Movie	Ralph Breaks the Internet	Nominated	
2021	Kids' Choice Awards	Favorite Movie Actress	Wonder Woman 1984	Nominated	
2021	Kids' Choice Awards	Favorite Superhero	Wonder Woman 1984	Nominated	
2021	MTV Movie & TV Awards	Best Hero	Wonder Woman 1984	Nominated	
2021	MTV Movie & TV Awards	Best Fight (Final fight between Justice League and Steppenwolf)	Zack Snyder's Justice League	Nominated	
2022	Critics' Choice Super Awards	Best Actress in a Superhero Movie	Zack Snyder's Justice League	Nominated	
2022	People Choice Awards	The Female Movie Star of 2022	Death on the Nile	Nominated	
2022	People Choice Awards	The Drama Movie Star of 2022	Death on the Nile	Nominated	
2024	Jupiter Award	Best International Actress	Heart of Stone	Nominated	
2024	49th People's Choice Awards	The Action Movie Star of the Year	Heart of Stone	Nominated	

== See also ==
- Israeli fashion
- Women in Israel
- List of Israelis

== Notes ==
Preceded by Sivan Klein	Miss Israel; 2004	Succeeded by Elena Ralph
