= Dantedì =

Italian commemoration day of Dante Alighieri

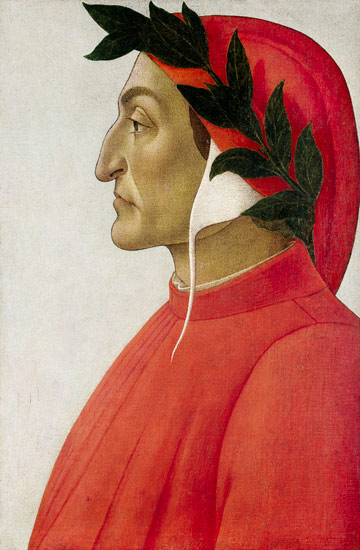
- Official name: Dantedì
- Also called: Dante Day
- Observed by: Italians
- Date: 25 March
- Frequency: Annual
- First time: 25 March 2020
- Started by: Paolo Di Stefano, Dario Franceschini
- Related to: Dante Alighieri

Dantedì is a national commemoration day dedicated to the Italian poet Dante Alighieri, celebrated in Italy every March 25.

The Dante Day was proposed on 17 January 2020 by Dario Franceschini, then Ministry of Culture, on an idea from the editorialist and writer Paolo Di Stefano for the commemoration of the seven hundredth anniversary of the poet's death, occurred on September 14, 1321. According to tradition based on many scholars and critics, March 25, 1300, should be the day in which Dante lost himself in the dark forest and begins his journey in the underworld.

On an article dated 19 June 2017 from the Corriere della Sera, Paolo Di Stefano suggested that Dante Alighieri deserved a national day dedicated to him similar to the Bloomsday dedicated to James Joyce. The idea, which was reproposed more times from Di Stefano himself, was followed by a promotional campaign from the same newspaper, and well received from many cultural associations, like the Accademia della Crusca, the Società Dantesca Italiana and the Dante Alighieri Society. The name “Dantedì” was created by the linguist Francesco Sabatini and Di Stefano.

For the first two editions in the 2020 and the 2021, the activities were carried online due to the restrictions against the COVID-19 pandemic. Up to now many initiatives have been organized for Dantedì by regional governments, cultural associations, museums, universities and schools. The commemorations have a great importance in Tuscany and Florence, where not only the poet was born but also 25 March is the first day in the Florentine calendar, and Emilia Romagna and Ravenna, where Dante died and still today is buried.
