= Ruby Porat-Shoval =

Israeli actress

- רובי פורת-שובל
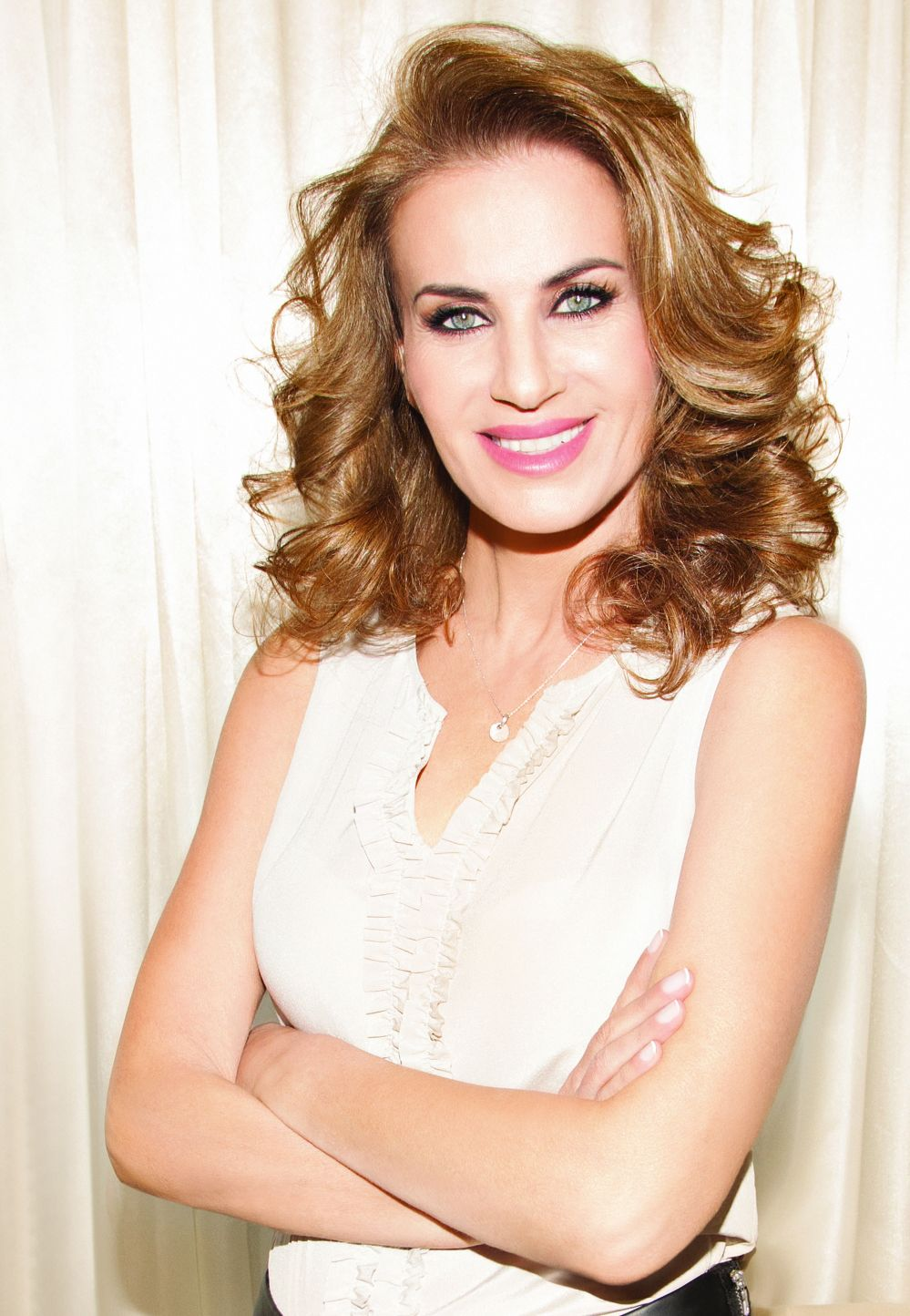
- Porat-Shoval in 2015
- Born: 15 June 1957 (age 69); Marrakesh, Morocco
- Occupations: Actress; screenwriter; playwright; theatre director; television presenter
- Years active: 1984–present
- Children: 2

Ruby Porat-Shoval (Hebrew: רובי פורת-שובל; born 15 June 1957) is an Israeli actress, screenwriter, playwright, theatre director and television presenter.

== Biography ==
Ruby was born in Marrakesh, Morocco and immigrated to Israel at her young ages.

Porat's career in film began in the late 1980s, when she played the role of Liza in the film 1989 film One of Us.

== Filmography ==
- 1989 – One of Us
- 1993 – Mehapeset Baal Al Arba
- 2002 – Halomot Metokim
- 2004 – Turn Left at the End of the World
- 2004 – Michaela
- 2007 – HaYisraelim
- 2007 – Melech Shel Kabzanim
- 2008 – Shiva
- 2010 – Asfur
- 2011 – After Death
- 2012 – Revaka plus
- 2013 – Haverot
- 2013 – Barely in Love
- 2014 – Gett: Le procès de Viviane Amsalem
- 2016 – Ptzuim BaRosh
- 2019 – BatEl HaBetula
