= Le Rime =

Group of lyric poems by Dante Alighieri

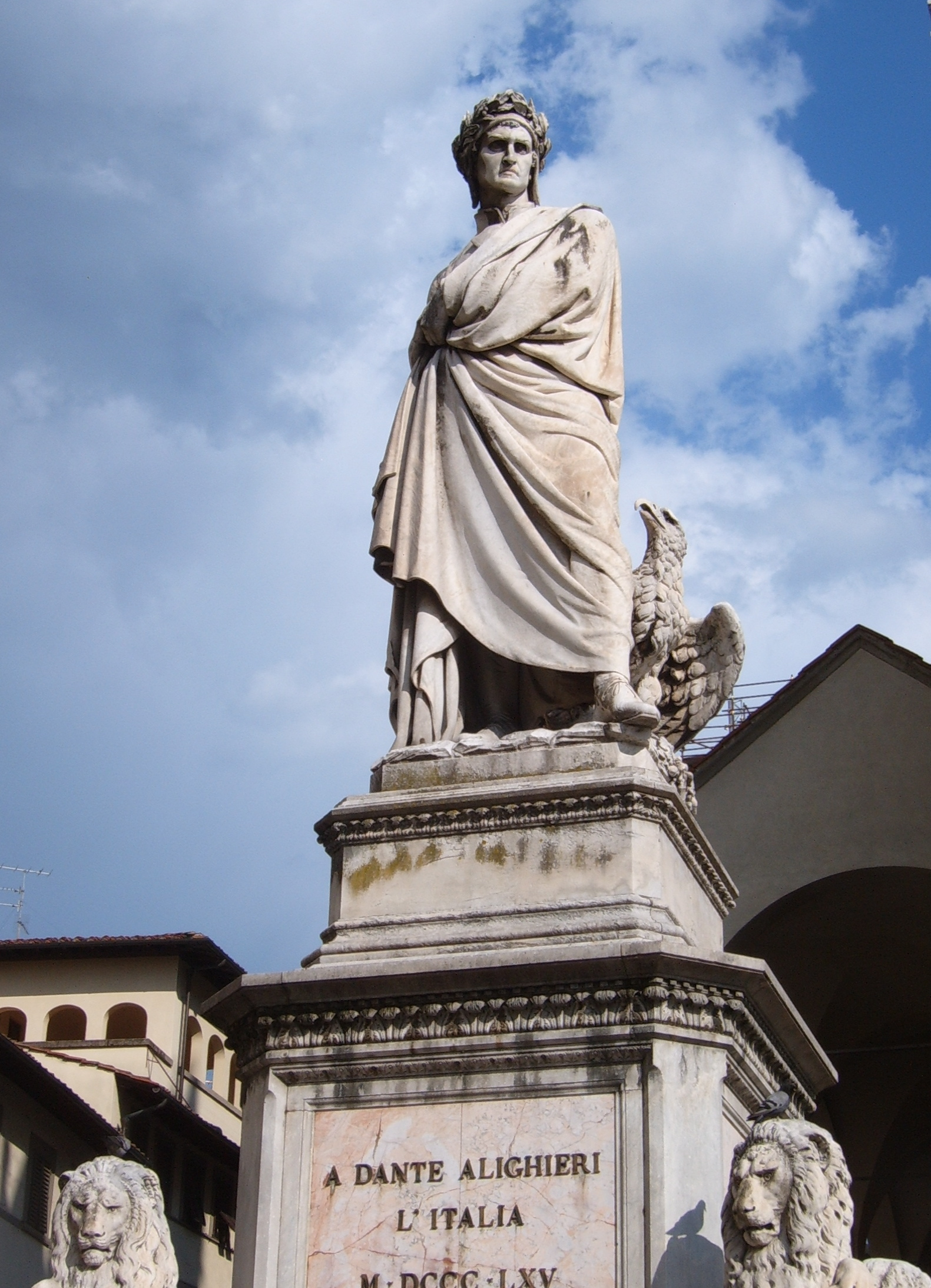
Statue of Dante in Florence, Italy

Le Rime (The Rhymes) are a group of lyric poems by Dante Alighieri written throughout his life and based on the poet's varied existential and stylistic experiences. They were not designed as a collection by Dante himself, but were collected and ordered later by modern critics.

A subsection of the collection is a group of four poems known as the Rime Petrose, love poems dedicated to a woman called Petra, composed around 1296. Stylistically those poems are regarded as a transition between the love lyric of La Vita Nuova and the more sacred subject matter of the Divine Comedy.
