= Jacopo Alighieri =

Son of Dante Alighieri (1285/6–1348)

Jacopo Alighieri (1289–1348; sometimes written as Iacopo Alighieri) was an Italian poet, the son of Dante Alighieri, whom he followed in his exile. Jacopo's most famous work is his sixty-chapter Dottrinale. He is represented by his father in the Paradiso of the Divine Comedy as Saint James along with Saint Peter and Saint John the Evangelist, representing his brothers Pietro and Giovanni.

== Biography ==
Born in 1289 in Florence, Jacopo was the son of Dante Alighieri and his wife, Gemma di Manetto Donati.

He was exiled from Florence with his father and brothers Giovanni and Pietro in 1315. He subsequently traveled to Ravenna, where he may have lived with his father. Dante died in 1321, and Jacopo sent a copy of the Divine Comedy to Guido da Polenta, the lord of the city. In 1325, he returned to Florence, where he took minor orders, making it possible for him to become a canon in Verona. At home, he took charge of his family's financial affairs; in 1343, he was able to retake possession of his father's confiscated property. In his later years, he had a troubled relationship with Jacopa di Biliotto degli Alfani, with whom he had a daughter named Alighiera and a son named Alighiero.

Jacopo died in 1348, likely in Florence from the Black Death.

== Works ==
- The Dottrinale has 60 chapters in seven-syllable rhyming couplets; each chapter consists of ten stanzas. It treats matters of astronomy and astrology, faith, the virtues of the Church and the State, love and hate, family, human beauty, and free will. The work is inspired by ancient authors, and sometimes imitates Dante. Divided into two sections, the Dottrinale first deals with the physical order, and then the moral.
- The Commento is virtually a terzina-by-terzina commentary of the text of the Inferno, which is the first of the three parts of the Divine Comedy. [Dante's poem is in terza rima, the form he created as the poem's poetic vehicle. The form's three-line stanzas are called terzinas.] Jacopo was one of the first to write a work of this kind. By 1340, less than two decades after Dante's death, six major commentaries were enlightening, guiding, and informing the work's ever-larger readership. (See Hollander's "Dante and his commentators" in The Cambridge Companion to Dante). The Commento accompanied the copies of the Comedy sent to Guido da Polenta.

== Additional bibliography ==
- G. Piccinini, ed. (1915). Chiose alla cantica dell'Inferno di Dante Alighieri scritte da Jacopo Alighieri pubblicate per la prima volta in corretta lezione con riscontri e fac-simili di codici, e procedute da una indagine critica per cura di Jarro. Firenze: G. Piccinini – via R. Bemporad & figlio editori.
- Jacopo Alighieri (1862). Giosuè Carducci (ed.). Le Rime di M. Cino da Pistoia e d'altri del secolo XIV. Milano: Giosuè Carducci – via Istituto Editoriale Italiano.
- Gaetano Maruca. "I commenti di Jacopo Alighieri, Jacopo della Lana e Boccaccio alla "Divina Commedia" di Dante e il Dartmouth Dante Project. Comunicazione tenuta alla 19ª Conferenza annuale dell'American Association of Italian Sudies Eugene, Oregon, 15-17 Aprile 1999" (PDF) (in Italian). pp. 3–5.
- Francesco Mazzoni (1970). Alighieri, Iacopo. Roma – via Istituto dell'Enciclopedia 3355ou88976yItaliana.
