= Eclogues (Dante) =

1319–1320 poems by Dante Alighieri

The Eclogues are two Latin hexameter poems in the bucolic style by Dante Alighieri, named after Virgil's Eclogues. The two poems are the 68-verse Vidimus in nigris albo patiente lituris and the 97-verse Velleribus Colchis prepes detectus Eous. They were composed between 1319 and 1320 in Ravenna, but only published for the first time in Florence in 1719.

Shortly before the first poem's composition, Giovanni del Virgilio, a Latin poet living in Bologna, sent an eclogue to Dante Alighieri in Ravenna inviting him to adopt the Latin bucolic style of poetry, which was, at the time, more popular and highly regarded. He expressed his belief that this would firmly establish Dante as the preeminent poet in Italy. In 1319, Dante wrote back in the same bucolic style. He expressed his desire to achieve that same renown, not through the popular Latin style, but through the quality of his Commedia, written in the common vernacular, which he sent Giovanni an excerpt of. The poem also contains philosophical reflections on poetic glory and Dante's desire to someday return from his exile to his hometown of Florence and be recognized for his abilities there.

Giovanni sent a reply insisting that Dante join him in Bologna, where he believes Dante would be accepted as the greatest poet of their age. Dante replied in 1320 with the second eclogue, explaining the danger of traveling to Bologna as a result of his exile. It reasserts his desire to establish himself in the common vernacular despite his contemporaries. The second poem expresses an even greater ability in the bucolic pastoral style than the first. Together, the poems assert Dante's vision for his works and their influence.
