= Asfur =

- Genre: Comedy, Drama, Action, Crime, Romance
- Created by: Hanan Savyon; Guy Amir
- Developed by: Sumayako Ltd
- Directed by: Rani Sa'ar
- Starring: Shalom Michaelshvili; Oz Zehavi; Guy Amir; Hanan Savyon
- Country of origin: Israel
- Original language: Hebrew
- No. of seasons: 2
- No. of episodes: 50 (Season 1); 20 (Season 2)

Production
- Running time: approx. 30 Minutes per episode
- Production company: Udi Segel Productions

Original release
- Network: HOT3
- Release: March 7, 2010 – December 27, 2011

Asfur (Hebrew: עספור) is an Israeli television series, which is broadcast on the channel HOT3. Its title, which literally means "bird" in Arabic, is the main protagonist's "good luck bird" – his late grandfather believed that its arrival symbolized a positive turn of events.

Hot (Israel) had already started working on two additional seasons even before the television pilot was aired. Season two began airing on October 17, 2011. Savyon and Amir sold the format to John Wells (of the Warner Bros. fame) in October 2011. The adaptation, named "Hard Up", will air on FOX.

== Plot ==
=== Season 1 (2010) ===
Motti Amoyal lives in an abandoned bus on a farm in Jerusalem with his three best friends, Itzik, Newton and Katzar. Their lives are about to change drastically as they discover that the land, on which Motti built the farm, holds an enormous debt to city hall because of his late grandfather's past disputes over garbage dumping. The city threatens to repossess the land because of the future profit from zoning plans. Amit Peled, an insurance agent who works for his overly demanding father, accidentally discovers the zoning plans and visits the farm in order to buy it. He arrives there with his girlfriend Shir, who sees Motti and they both recall that they were romantically involved during a trip to India.

Upon learning of the zoning plans, the four friends realize that keeping the farm is their chance of redeeming their lives. From that moment on, it becomes a race against time for them. They try every possible scheme, be it working on a taxicab they "borrow" from the repair shop where Itzik works, laundering the lottery Grand Prize through the black market, stealing from houses, gambling online, selling drugs or even committing armed robbery for a criminal lord. The season's plot mainly revolves around their adventures, as well as the intricately woven relationship between Shir and Motti, along with other romantic complications.

=== Season 2 (2011) ===
Picking up approximately 6 months following the events of season 1, Motti is living with Shir, who by then had divorced Amit and moved to the bus farm, but is inclined to move to Tel Aviv, much to Motti's dismay. Newton returns from his trip to Peru just in time for his aunt's funeral, and Katzar reads a book left at Itzik's apparent death scene, which he sees as a deliberate hint towards Itzik's ruse and encourages everyone to keep their hopes up. Initially skeptic, the three remaining friends decide to embark on a trip to Amsterdam to try and follow Katzar's intuition. Motti remembers an ex-girlfriend, Reli Eugenia, and looks her up on Facebook. Upon seeing her son's picture, he decides to pass through Barcelona (without telling Shir) to find up whether he is the child's father; on the plane, he bumps into Itai, who is now married to Yuli and they have a baby together. After a bumbling attempt for a random search, Newton and Katzar spot Itzik attending a soccer game on TV and notify Motti, who by then reconnects with Reli; she seems happy to see Motti, but denies his paternity of Enrique, her son, due to his romantic involvement with Shir. Encouraged by the news about Itzik, Motti comes to Amsterdam and the three start actively looking for Itzik.

Meanwhile, Itzik lives in Marseille with Juliette, working in her father's winery and desperately trying to win his approval. After a series of failures, Itzik befriends Kika, an Israeli coffee shop owner in Amsterdam, who hooks him up with a series of illegal drug smuggling jobs for an eccentric French-Israeli entrepreneur named Ouliel. Itzik tries to disguise the money he makes as successful wine deliveries, but Juliette's father calls his bluff rather quickly, and Juliette herself discovers the nature of Itzik's endeavors; enraged, she orders him to leave her house and never return. Itzik does so and goes to stay in a hotel; unbeknownst to him, the three friends are in the same hotel, after accidentally getting to Kika's coffee shop, receiving the winery's address from her and subsequently getting no help from Juliette's father. The four reunite in a joyfully tearful manner, but get involuntarily tangled in what turns out to be a failed hit by Mossad agents (including Itai) on a radical Islamic terrorist link when Motti saves Itai from a gunshot. Panicking, they flee the hotel, with Itai critically wounded, and inadvertently become fugitives after the French police discovers the CCTV footage, believing the four to be accomplices.

Now on the run, they are detained by Mossad agents, but are quickly intercepted by the Islamists, who manage to steal their passports. Itzik contacts Ouliel, as he believes him to be the best source of help. Incidentally, Ouliel has a business partner named Nassimian, who is a friend of Kobi's and is aware of Kobi's still-ongoing hunt after Itzik. Ouliel initially connects Itzik with an associate of his who issues fake passports, but the Islamists track down his trailer, kill him and wait for the four to return. Kobi, having received information from Nassimian, enters the trailer and is mistakenly shot by the Islamists. The four return and accidentally manage to knock one of the Islamists unconscious, discover the critically wounded Kobi in the trailer and reluctantly decide to drop him off at a nearby hospital. In the hospital, Motti notices sketches of their faces and manages to escape before the police arrives. Having taken the trailer and noticing a small Barça ball which reminded him of his earlier bonding with Enrique, Motti decides to hide at Reli's hotel.

Meanwhile, back in Israel, Shir grows concerned over Motti's absence, and befriends Danny, an archaeologist sent to the bus farm on the behalf of City Hall to search for ancient remains with possible historical value. Danny is a dialysis patient who desperately needs a kidney transplant, and later turns out to be Kika's brother, which also explains her involvement with Ouliel to raise money for Danny's transplant. When Danny is informed of the possibility of a transplant in Israel, Shir accompanies him to the hospital but is surprised to see Yuli there, as the situation arose from Itai's critical condition, and therefore Danny's transplant is in opposite correlation with Itai's chances of survival. Not fully realizing it, Shir stays to support Yuli, and the two reconnect. When Shir tells Yuli about Motti's unexplained absence, Yuli rekindles her detestation of Motti and encourages Shir to move on, possibly with Danny. Itai manages to recover, and the subsequent bad news leaves Kika amidst a dilemma, as the Islamists have requested Ouliel to aid them in finding the four, and Ouliel puts Kika on that mission, promising her the money Danny needs for a transplant in a European hospital. She tells Ouliel that she does not know of their whereabouts, mainly due to her romantic feelings towards Itzik, but contacts them anyway and joins them in their journey to Spain.

At the Eugenia hotel, Reli reluctantly agrees to harbor the four. She admits that Enrique is Motti's son, but forbids Motti to visit Enrique, as she is married to Xavier, who has no knowledge of Reli's romantic endeavors in Israel or the fact that Enrique is not his son, and who also turns out to be a police officer. The four are now working at the hotel to pay for their stay; Katzar and Newton, separately, meet two Israeli sisters, who appear to be from a famous rich family. Katzar earlier found out that the aunt that had recently died was his biological mother, who became legally crazy after being raped and spent the rest of her life in a wheelchair; now he tries to win the heart of a wheelchair-using former model, Anaelle. Newton developed a "man crush" on a guy named Johnny during his trip to Peru, but Johnny slept with Orly behind his back and both abandoned Newton separately; emasculated by the incident, Newton is trying to imitate Johnny's personality (even introducing himself as "Johnny, the musician") to impress Anaelle's sister, Tamar. Having lost his cell phone, Motti dials the only number he remembers by heart – his childhood friend Amir, and asks him to tell Shir that he is safe and sound. Shir is relieved, but Yuli, oblivious to Itai's work and thus the whole story, encourages her to think that Motti is acting selfishly; when Itai understands that, he feels he owes Motti his life and tells Shir things are not as they seem. Itai accidentally tells her that Motti flew to Barcelona, and later Shir answers Danny's phone, where Kika tells her she is in Barcelona, and Shir is puzzled whether there is connection.

Itai's father reveals that the four might become casualties of Mossad's cover-up of the fiasco, and Itai unsuccessfully pleads him to change it with the higher-ups. Enrique gets attached to Motti, and Xavier starts realizing that Motti is more than a friend to Reli; by a series of deductions, he concludes that Motti is Enrique's father and leaves Reli. Motti unsuccessfully tries talking Xavier out of it at the police station, but manages to snatch a fax with their face sketches that had arrived from the French police. Now believing they need to leave, Motti talks to Gaston, a guest he befriended earlier, and asks him to come to Israel in his yacht.

== Characters ==
- Mordechai "Motti" Amoyal (Shalom Michaelshvili) - the leader of the group. Inherited the farm from his grandfather, now lives on it with his three best friends. During the course of the first season, he manages an on-and-off romantic relationship with Shir, whom he had previously met during a trip to India.
- Yitzhak "Itzik" Bensuli (Oz Zehavi) - a reckless womanizer, ran away from home following a confrontation with his father. When it comes to survival, Itzik is not above resorting to criminal activity.
- Ra'anan "Katzar" (Hebrew For "Short") Avital (Guy Amir) - Newton's cousin. Has a short fuse, hence the nickname.
- Morley "Newton" Avital (Hanan Savyon) - Katzar's cousin. Constantly brews various schemes, hence the nickname.
- Shir Amber (Efrat Dor) - a lawyer at "Peled Insurance" and Amit's on-and-off girlfriend and later wife. During the course of the first season, she also manages an on-and-off romantic relationship with Motti, whom she had previously met during a trip to India.
- Amit Peled (Dan Shapiro) - Shir's on-and-off boyfriend and later husband. Works in his father's insurance company, where he maintains a harsh rivalry for the VP position with his brother-in-law, Oded. His rivalry with Motti is even harsher, as it is for both Shir's heart and the bus farm. Constantly hinders Motti's attempts to muster the money, with the help of Itay and Yuli.
- Victor (Gabi Amrani) - Motti's late grandfather.
- Itay Bachar (Amos Tamam) - Amit's best friend, a secret service agent who is after a criminal mastermind named Saragusti. Yuli's partner. A father to Tom.
- Yuli Barkai (Dana Frider) - Shir's best friend. Frequently dates different men. Despises Motti because of his social class. Itay's partner. Tom's Mother.
- Sivan Amoyal (Gloria Bess Kopilevitz) - Motti's younger sister, an excelling student who unknowingly starts selling stolen goods to pay for a school trip to Poland because of her family's poverty.
- Ya'acov "Kobi" Sharvit (Aviv Alush) - Itzik's friend in the criminal world. Appears to be Saragusti's main henchman.
- Tavor (Or Ben-Melech) - a student in Sivan's high school who also works with Kobi. Engages Sivan in selling stolen goods and the two eventually start dating.
- Reuven Amoyal (Uri Gavriel) - Sivan and Motti's father. Works as a security guard and is terrified of the probability of his children turning to crime.
- Shula Amoyal (Ruby Porat-Shoval) - Sivan and Motti's mother, married to Reuven.
- Shlomo (Nathan Zehavi) - the owner of an auto repair shop where Itzik works.
- Zvulun "Zuta" Hajbi (Nevo Kimchi) - an acquaintance of the group, has a mental disability of sorts. Wins the Grand Prize in the Israeli lottery.
- Tzuf Nakdimon (Pini Tavger) - a terminally ill young gay man, formerly an orthodox Jew. Motti helps him solve a family crisis and Tzuf returns the favor by writing a check for the debt sum.
