= Paolo Di Stefano =

Italian writer

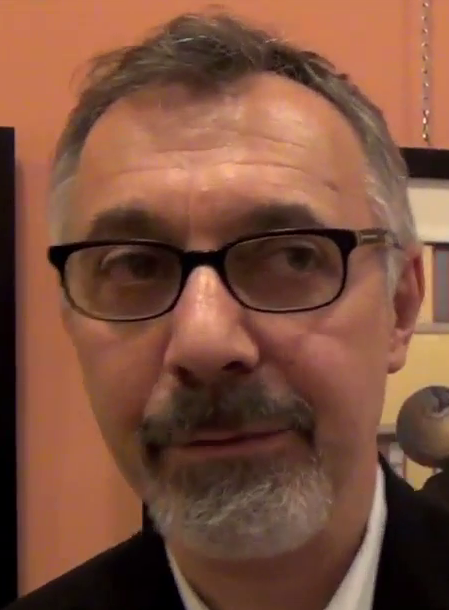
- Born: 1956 (age 69–70); Avola, Syracuse, Sicily, Italy
- Occupation: Writer

Paolo Di Stefano (born 1956) is an Italian novelist and journalist.

== Life and career ==
Born in Avola, Di Stefano graduated in Romance studies at the University of Pavia and then started working as a journalist and a columnist for various publications, including Corriere della Sera, La Repubblica and Corriere del Ticino. He debuted as a novelist in 1994, and won several awards including the Viareggio Prize in 2013 for Giallo d'Avola and the Bagutta Prize in 2016 for Ogni altra vita. In 2008 he was a finalist of the Premio Campiello for the novel Nel cuore che ti cerca. He is also an author of essays, short stories and collections of poems.
