= Dante Alighieri =

Italian writer and philosopher (1265–1321)

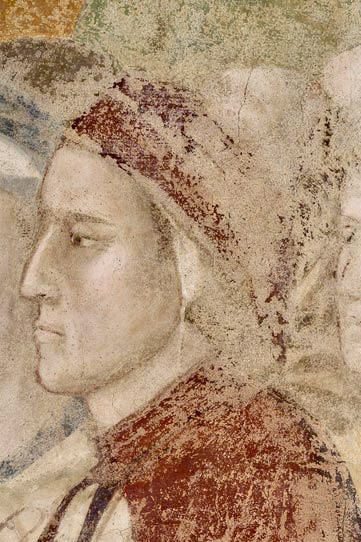
- Alleged Dante portrait (Note: Attributed to Giotto, it was painted c. 1335 and has been restored.) in the chapel of the Bargello palace, Florence.
- Born: Durante di Alighiero degli Alighieri (Note: Italian pronunciation: [duˈrante dj aliˈɡjɛːro deʎʎ aliˈɡjɛːri]. The name Dante is understood to be a hypocorism of the name Durante, though no document known to survive from Dante's lifetime refers to him as Durante (including his own writings). A document prepared for Dante's son Jacopo refers to "Durante, often called Dante". He may have been named for his maternal grandfather Durante degli Abati.) c. May 1265; Florence
- Died: September 14, 1321 (aged c. 56); Ravenna, Papal States
- Resting place: Tomb of Dante, Ravenna
- Occupations: Statesman; poet; language theorist; political theorist
- Spouse: Gemma Donati
- Children: 4, including Jacopo
- Relatives: Alighiero di Bellincione (father)
- Writing career
- Language: Italian (Tuscan); Latin
- Period: Late Middle Ages
- Notable work: Divine Comedy
- Movement: Dolce Stil Novo

Dante Alighieri (Italian: [ˈdante aliˈɡjɛːri]; most likely baptized Durante di Alighiero degli Alighieri; c. May 1265 – September 14, 1321), widely known mononymously as Dante, (Note: English pronunciation: /ˈdɑːnteɪ, ˈdænteɪ, ˈdænti/ DA(H)N-tay, DAN-tee.) was an Italian (Note: Dante described himself as "the humble Italian Dante Alighieri, a Florentine and guiltless refugee" ("l'umile italiano Dante Alighieri fiorentino ed esule senza colpa").) poet, writer, and philosopher. His Divine Comedy, originally called Comedìa (modern Italian: Commedia) and later christened Divina by Giovanni Boccaccio, is widely considered one of the most important poems of the Middle Ages and the greatest literary work in the Italian language.

At a time when Latin was still the dominant language for scholarly and literary writing—and when many Italian poets drew inspiration from French or Provençal traditions—Dante broke with both by writing in the vernacular, specifically his native Tuscan dialect. His De vulgari eloquentia (On Eloquence in the Vernacular) was one of the first scholarly defenses of the vernacular as well as a watershed study of the troubadour tradition and its craft of rhyme. His use of the Florentine dialect for works such as The New Life (1295) and Divine Comedy helped establish the modern-day standardized Italian language. His work set a precedent that important Italian writers such as Petrarch and Boccaccio would later follow.

Dante was instrumental in establishing the literature of Italy, and is considered to be among the country's national poets and the Western world's greatest literary icons. His depictions of Hell, Purgatory, and Heaven provided inspiration for the larger body of Western art and literature. He influenced English writers such as Geoffrey Chaucer, John Milton, and Alfred Tennyson, among many others. In addition, the first use of the interlocking three-line rhyme scheme, or the terza rima, is attributed to him. He is described as the "father" of the Italian language, and in Italy he is often referred to as il Sommo Poeta ("the Supreme Poet"). Dante, Petrarch, and Boccaccio are also called the tre corone ("three crowns") of Italian literature.

== Early life ==
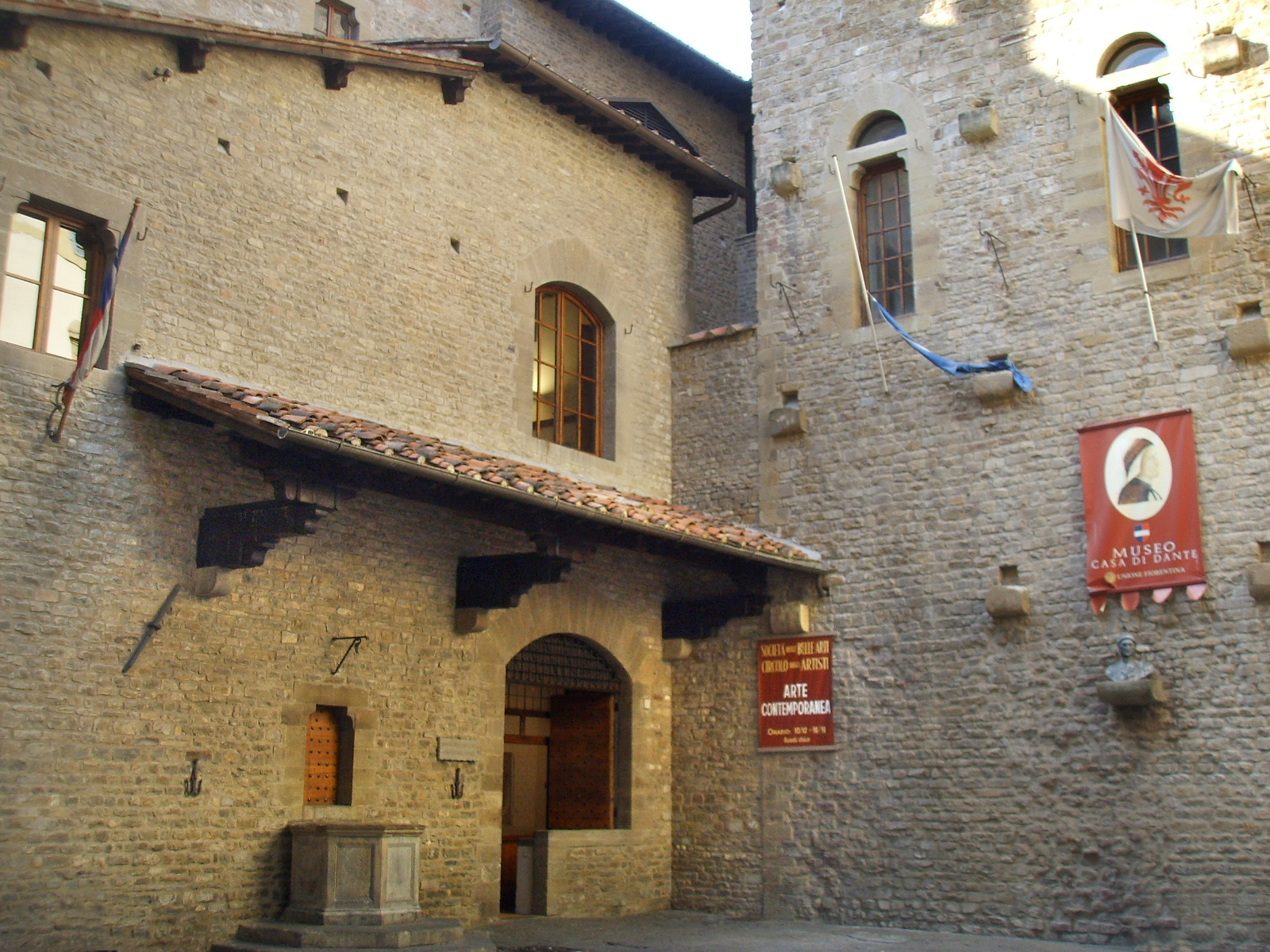
Dante's house museum in Florence. The house has been significantly altered since Dante's time.

Dante was born in Florence. The exact date of his birth is unknown, although it is believed to be around May 1265. This can be deduced from autobiographic allusions in the Divine Comedy. Its first section, the Inferno, begins, "Nel mezzo del cammin di nostra vita" ("Midway upon the journey of our life"), implying that Dante was around 35 years old, since the average lifespan according to the Bible (Psalm 89:10, Vulgate) is 70 years; and since his imaginary travel to the netherworld took place in 1300, he was most probably born around 1265. Some verses of the Paradiso section of the Divine Comedy also provide a possible clue that he was born under the sign of Gemini: "As I revolved with the eternal twins, I saw revealed, from hills to river outlets, the threshing-floor that makes us so ferocious" (XXII 151–154). In 1265, the sun was in Gemini between approximately May 11 and June 11 (Julian calendar).

Dante claimed that his family descended from the ancient Romans (Inferno, XV, 76), but the earliest relative he could mention by name was his great-great-grandfather Cacciaguida degli Elisei (Paradiso, XV, 135), born no earlier than about 1100. Dante's father was Alighiero di Bellincione, a businessman and moneylender, and Dante's mother was Bella, probably a member of the Abati family, a noble Florentine family. She died when Dante was not yet ten years old. Alighiero soon married again, to Lapa di Chiarissimo Cialuffi. It is uncertain whether he really married her, since widowers were socially limited in such matters, but she definitely bore him two children, Dante's half-brother Francesco and half-sister Tana (Gaetana).

During Dante's time, most Northern Italian city states were split into two political factions: the Guelphs, who supported the papacy, and the Ghibellines, who supported the Holy Roman Empire. Dante's family was loyal to the Guelphs. The Ghibellines took over Florence at the Battle of Montaperti in 1260, forcing out many of the Guelphs. Although Dante's family were Guelphs, they suffered no reprisals after the battle, probably because of Alighiero's low public standing. The Guelphs later fought the Ghibellines again in 1266 at the Battle of Benevento, retaking Florence from the Ghibellines.

Dante said he first met Beatrice Portinari, daughter of Folco Portinari, when he was nine (she was eight), and he claimed to have fallen in love with her "at first sight", apparently without even talking with her. When he was 12, however, he was promised in marriage to Gemma di Manetto Donati, daughter of Manetto Donati, member of the powerful Donati family. Contracting marriages for children at such an early age was quite common and involved a formal ceremony, including contracts signed before a notary. Dante claimed to have seen Beatrice again frequently after he turned 18, exchanging greetings with her in the streets of Florence, though he never knew her well.

Years after his marriage to Gemma, he claims to have met Beatrice again; he wrote several sonnets to Beatrice but never mentioned Gemma in any of his poems. He refers to other Donati relations, notably Forese and Piccarda, in his Divine Comedy. The exact date of his marriage is not known; the only certain information is that, before his exile in 1301, he had fathered three children with Gemma (Pietro, Jacopo and Antonia).

Dante fought with the Guelph cavalry at the Battle of Campaldino (June 11, 1289). This victory brought about a reformation of the Florentine constitution. To take part in public life, one had to enroll in one of the city's many commercial or artisan guilds, so Dante entered the Physicians' and Apothecaries' Guild. His name is occasionally recorded as speaking or voting in the councils of the republic. Many minutes from such meetings between 1298 and 1300 were lost, so the extent of his participation is uncertain.

== Education and poetry ==
Not much is known about Dante's education; he presumably studied at home or in a chapter school attached to a church or monastery in Florence. It is known that he studied Tuscan poetry and that he admired the compositions of the Bolognese poet Guido Guinizelli—in Purgatorio XXVI he characterized him as his "father"—at a time when the Sicilian School (Scuola poetica Siciliana), a cultural group from Sicily, was becoming known in Tuscany. He also discovered the Provençal poetry of the troubadours, such as Arnaut Daniel, and the Latin writers of classical antiquity, including Cicero, Ovid and especially Virgil.

Dante's interactions with Beatrice set an example of so-called courtly love, a phenomenon developed in French and Provençal poetry of prior centuries. Dante's experience of such love was typical, but his expression of it was unique. It was in the name of this love that Dante left his imprint on the dolce stil nuovo ("sweet new style", a term that Dante himself coined), and he would join other contemporary poets and writers in exploring never-before-emphasized aspects of love. Love for Beatrice (as Petrarch would express for Laura somewhat differently) would be his reason for writing poetry and for living, together with political passions. In many of his poems, she is depicted as semi-divine, watching over him constantly and providing spiritual instruction, sometimes harshly. When Beatrice died in 1290, Dante sought refuge in Latin literature. The Convivio chronicles his having read Boethius's De consolatione philosophiae and Cicero's De Amicitia.

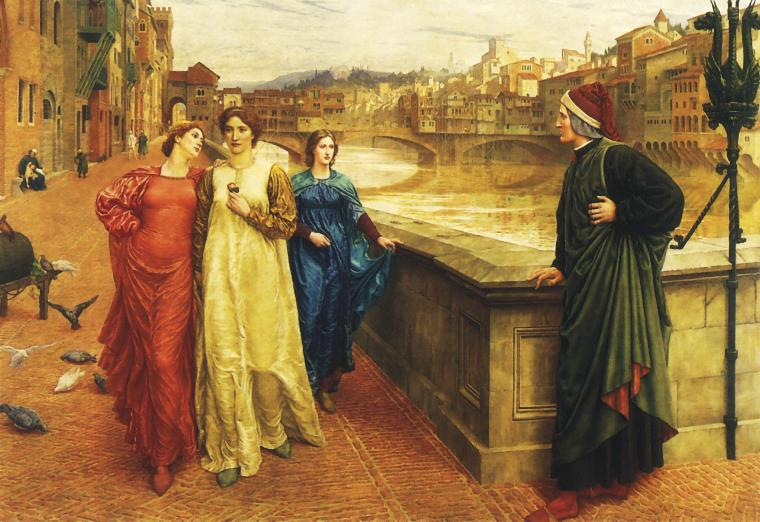
Dante and Beatrice, by Henry Holiday, inspired by La Vita Nuova, 1883

He next dedicated himself to philosophical studies at religious schools like the Dominican one in Santa Maria Novella. He took part in the disputes that the two principal mendicant orders (Franciscan and Dominican) publicly or indirectly held in Florence, the former explaining the doctrines of the mystics and of St. Bonaventure, the latter expounding on the theories of St. Thomas Aquinas.

At around the age of 18, Dante met Guido Cavalcanti, Lapo Gianni, Cino da Pistoia and, soon after, Brunetto Latini; together they became the leaders of the dolce stil nuovo. Brunetto later received special mention in the Divine Comedy (Inferno, XV, 28) for what he had taught Dante: "Nor speaking less on that account I go With Ser Brunetto, and I ask who are his most known and most eminent companions". Some fifty poetical commentaries by Dante are known (the so-called Rime, rhymes), others being included in the later Vita Nuova and Convivio. Other studies are reported, or deduced from Vita Nuova or the Comedy, regarding painting and music.

== Florence and politics ==
Dante, like most Florentines of his day, was embroiled in the Guelph–Ghibelline conflict. He fought in the Battle of Campaldino (June 11, 1289), with the Florentine Guelphs against Arezzo Ghibellines; he fought as a feditore, responsible for the first attack. To further his political career, he obtained admission to the Guild of Physicians and Apothecaries around 1295. He likely joined the guild due to association between philosophy and medicine, but also may have joined as apothecaries were also booksellers. His guild membership allowed him to hold public office in Florence. As a politician, he held various offices over some years in a city rife with political unrest.

After defeating the Ghibellines, the Guelphs divided into two factions: the White Guelphs (Guelfi Bianchi)—Dante's party, led by Vieri dei Cerchi—and the Black Guelphs (Guelfi Neri), led by Corso Donati. Although the split was along family lines at first, ideological differences arose based on opposing views of the papal role in Florentine affairs. The Blacks supported the Pope and the Whites wanted more freedom from Rome. The Whites took power first and expelled the Blacks. In response, Pope Boniface VIII planned a military occupation of Florence. In 1301, Charles of Valois, brother of King Philip IV of France, was expected to visit Florence because the Pope had appointed him as peacemaker for Tuscany, but the city's government had treated the Pope's ambassadors badly a few weeks before, seeking independence from papal influence. It was believed Charles had received other unofficial instructions, so the council sent a delegation that included Dante to Rome to persuade the Pope not to send Charles to Florence.

== Exile from Florence ==
Pope Boniface quickly dismissed the other delegates and asked Dante alone to remain in Rome. At the same time (November 1, 1301), Charles of Valois entered Florence with the Black Guelphs, who in the next six days destroyed much of the city and killed many of their enemies. A new Black Guelph government was installed, and Cante dei Gabrielli da Gubbio was appointed podestà of the city. In March 1302, Dante, a White Guelph by affiliation, along with the Gherardini family, was condemned to exile for two years and ordered to pay a large fine. Dante was accused of corruption and financial wrongdoing by the Black Guelphs for the time that Dante was serving as city prior (Florence's highest position) for two months in 1300. The poet was still in Rome in 1302, as the Pope, who had backed the Black Guelphs, had "suggested" that Dante stay there. Florence under the Black Guelphs, therefore, considered Dante an absconder.

Dante did not pay the fine, in part because he believed he was not guilty and in part because all his assets in Florence had been seized by the Black Guelphs. He was condemned to perpetual exile; if he had returned to Florence without paying the fine, he could have been burned at the stake. (In June 2008, nearly seven centuries after his death, the city council of Florence passed a motion rescinding Dante's sentence.) In 1306–07, Dante was a guest of Moroello Malaspina in the region of Lunigiana.

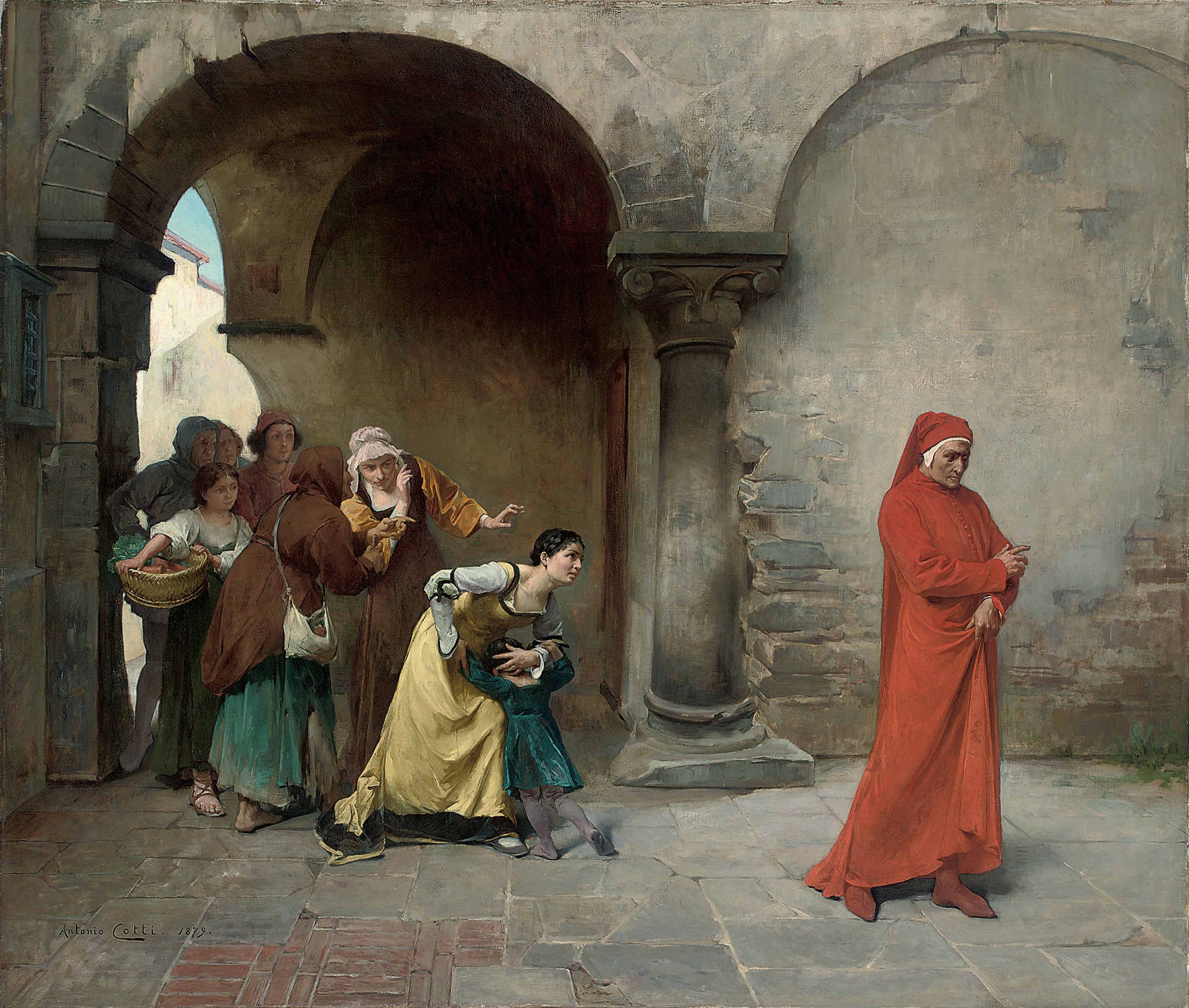
Dante in Verona, by Antonio Cotti, 1879

Dante took part in several attempts by the White Guelphs to regain power, but these failed due to treachery. Bitter at the treatment he received from his enemies, he grew disgusted with the infighting and ineffectiveness of his former allies and vowed to become a party of one. He went to Verona as a guest of Bartolomeo I della Scala, then moved to Sarzana in Liguria. Later he is supposed to have lived in Lucca with a woman named Gentucca. She apparently made his stay comfortable (and he later gratefully mentioned her in Purgatorio, XXIV, 37). Some speculative sources claim he visited Paris between 1308 and 1310, and other sources even less trustworthy say he went to Oxford; these claims, first made in Giovanni Boccaccio's book on Dante several decades after his death, seem inspired by readers who were impressed with the poet's wide learning and erudition. No longer occupied with the day-to-day affairs of Florentine politics after his exile, Dante deepened his engagement with philosophy and literature, as seen in the intellectual rigor and thematic scope of his prose works from this period. Yet, while his ideas traveled widely, there is no definitive evidence that he ever left Italy. Dante's Immensa Dei dilectione testante to Henry VII of Luxembourg confirms his residence "beneath the springs of Arno, near Tuscany" in April 1311.

In 1310, Holy Roman Emperor Henry VII of Luxembourg marched into Italy at the head of 5,000 troops. Dante saw in him a new Charlemagne who would restore the office of the Holy Roman Emperor to its former glory and also retake Florence from the Black Guelphs. He wrote to Henry and several Italian princes, demanding that they destroy the Black Guelphs. Mixing religion and private concerns in his writings, he invoked the worst anger of God against his city and suggested several particular targets, who were also his personal enemies. It was during this time that he wrote De Monarchia, proposing a universal monarchy under Henry VII.

At some point during his exile, he conceived of the Comedy, but the date is uncertain. The work is far more assured and ambitious than anything he had written in Florence. It is likely that he would have undertaken such a project only after accepting that his political ambitions, which had been central to him before his banishment, may have been indefinitely disrupted. It is also noticeable that Beatrice has returned to his imagination with renewed force and with a wider meaning than in the Vita Nuova; in Convivio (written c. 1304–07) he had declared that the memory of this youthful romance belonged to the past.

An early indication that the poem was underway is a notice by Francesco da Barberino, tucked into his Documenti d'Amore (Lessons of Love), probably written in 1314 or early 1315. Francesco notes that Dante followed the Aeneid in a poem called "Comedy" and that the setting of this poem (or part of it) was the underworld; i.e., hell. The brief note gives no incontestable indication that Barberino had read or even seen the Inferno, or that this part had been published at the time, but it indicates composition was well underway and that the sketching of the poem might have begun some years before. (It has been suggested that a knowledge of Dante's work also underlies some of the illuminations in Francesco da Barberino's earlier Officiolum [c. 1305–08], a manuscript that came to light in 2003.) It is known that the Inferno had been published by 1317; this is established by quoted lines interspersed in the margins of contemporary dated records from Bologna, but there is no certainty as to whether the three parts of the poem were each published in full or, rather, a few cantos at a time. Paradiso was likely finished before he died, but it may have been published posthumously.

In 1312, Henry assaulted Florence and defeated the Black Guelphs, but there is no evidence that Dante was involved. Some say he refused to participate in the attack on his city by a foreigner; others suggest that he had become unpopular with the White Guelphs, too, and that any trace of his passage had carefully been removed. Henry VII died (from a fever) in 1313 and with him any hope for Dante to see Florence again. He returned to Verona, where Cangrande I della Scala allowed him to live in certain security and, presumably, in a fair degree of prosperity. Cangrande was admitted to Dante's Paradise (Paradiso, XVII, 76).

During the period of his exile, Dante corresponded with Dominican theologian Fr. Nicholas Brunacci (1240–1322), who had been a student of Thomas Aquinas at the Santa Sabina studium in Rome, later at Paris, and of Albert the Great at the Cologne studium. Brunacci became lector at the Santa Sabina studium, forerunner of the Pontifical University of Saint Thomas Aquinas, and later served in the papal curia.

In 1315, Florence was forced by Uguccione della Faggiuola (the military officer controlling the town) to grant an amnesty to those in exile, including Dante. But for this, Florence required public penance in addition to payment of a high fine. Dante refused, preferring to remain in exile. When Uguccione defeated Florence, Dante's death sentence was commuted to house arrest, on condition that he go to Florence to swear he would never enter the town again. He refused to go, and his death sentence was confirmed and extended to his sons. Despite this, he still hoped late in life that he might be invited back to Florence on honorable terms, particularly in praise of his poetry.

== Death and burial ==
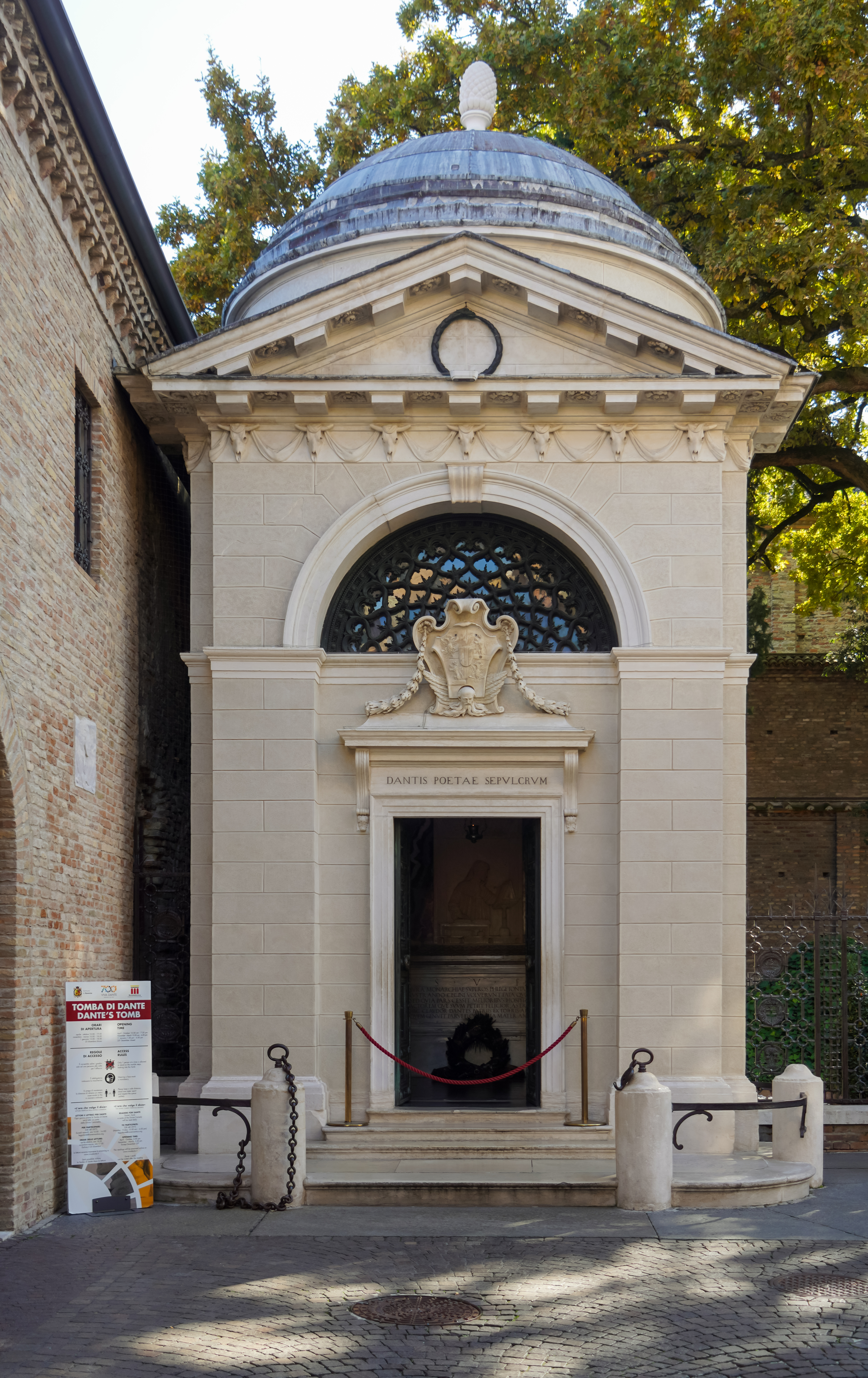
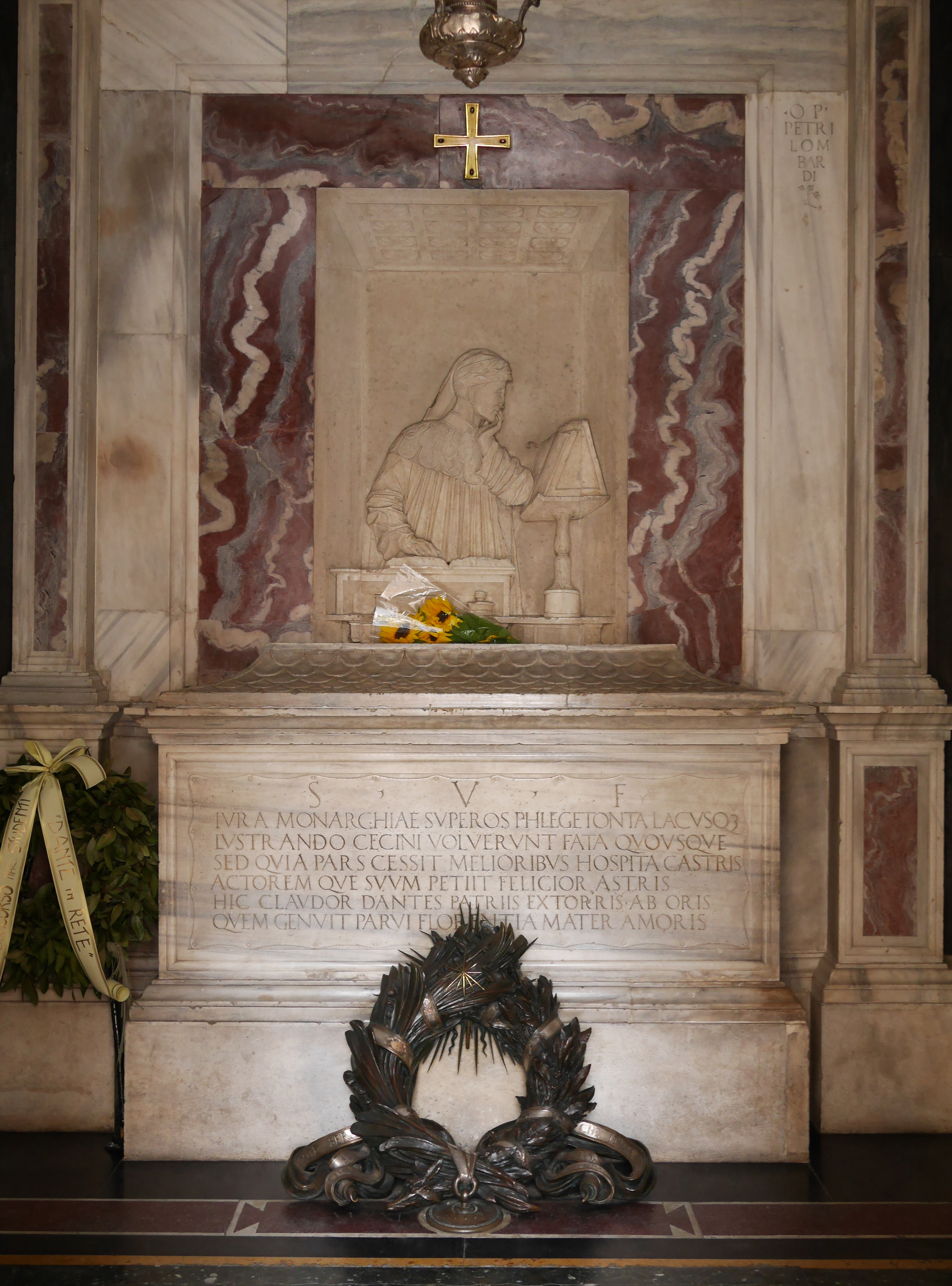
Dante's tomb exterior and interior in Ravenna, built in 1780

Dante's final days were spent in Ravenna, where he had been invited to stay in the city in 1318 by its prince, Guido II da Polenta. Dante died in Ravenna on September 14, 1321, aged about 56, of quartan malaria contracted while returning from a diplomatic mission to the Republic of Venice. He was attended by his three children, and possibly by Gemma Donati, and by friends and admirers he had in the city. He was buried in Ravenna at the Church of San Pier Maggiore (later called Basilica di San Francesco). Bernardo Bembo, praetor of Venice, erected a tomb for him in 1483.

On the grave, a verse of Bernardo Canaccio, a friend of Dante, is dedicated to Florence:

parvi Florentia mater amoris

Translation:

Florence, mother of little love

In 1329, Bertrand du Pouget, Cardinal and nephew of Pope John XXII, classified Dante's Monarchia as heretical and sought to have his bones burned at the stake. Ostasio I da Polenta and Pino della Tosa, allies of Pouget, interceded to prevent the destruction of Dante's remains.

Florence eventually came to regret having exiled Dante. The city made repeated requests for the return of his remains. The custodians of the body in Ravenna refused, at one point going so far as to conceal the bones in a false wall of the monastery. Florence built a tomb for Dante in 1829, in the Basilica of Santa Croce. That tomb has been empty ever since, with Dante's body remaining in Ravenna. The front of his tomb in Florence reads Onorate l'altissimo poeta—which roughly translates as "Honor the most exalted poet" and is a quote from the fourth canto of the Inferno.

In 1945, the fascist government discussed bringing Dante's remains to the Valtellina Redoubt, the Alpine valley in which the regime intended to make its last stand against the Allies. The case was made that "the greatest symbol of Italianness" should be present at fascism's "heroic" end, but ultimately, no action was taken.

A copy of Dante's death mask has been displayed since 1911 in the Palazzo Vecchio; scholars today believe it is not a true death mask and was probably carved in 1483, perhaps by Pietro and Tullio Lombardo.

== Legacy ==
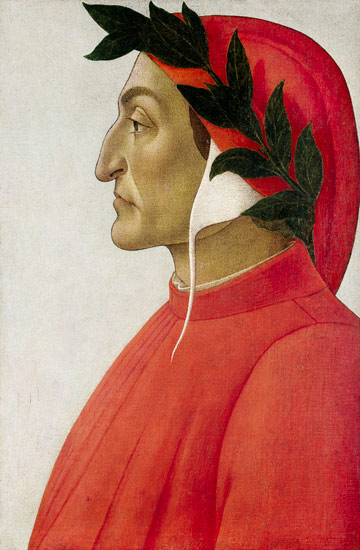
Posthumous portrait in tempera by Sandro Botticelli, 1495

The first formal biography of Dante was the Vita di Dante (also known as Trattatello in laude di Dante), written after 1348 by Giovanni Boccaccio. Although several statements and episodes of it have been deemed unreliable on the basis of modern research, an earlier account of Dante's life and works had been included in the Nuova Cronica of the Florentine chronicler Giovanni Villani.

Some 16th-century English Protestants, such as John Bale and John Foxe, argued that Dante was a proto-Protestant because of his opposition to the pope.

The 19th century saw a "Dante revival", a product of the medieval revival, which was itself an important aspect of Romanticism. Thomas Carlyle profiled him in "The Hero as Poet", the third lecture in On Heroes, Hero-Worship, & the Heroic in History (1841): "He is world-great not because he is worldwide, but because he is world-deep… Dante is the spokesman of the Middle Ages; the Thought they lived by stands here, in everlasting music." Leigh Hunt, Henry Francis Cary and Henry Wadsworth Longfellow were among Dante's translators of the era.

Italy's first dreadnought battleship was completed in 1913 and named Dante Alighieri in honor of him.

On April 30, 1921, in honor of the 600th anniversary of Dante's death, Pope Benedict XV promulgated an encyclical named In praeclara summorum, naming Dante as one "of the many celebrated geniuses of whom the Catholic faith can boast" and the "pride and glory of humanity", highlighting the philosophical and theological debt of Dante versus Thomas Aquinas and thomism.

On December 7, 1965, Pope Paul VI promulgated the Latin motu proprio titled Altissimi cantus, which was dedicated to Dante's figure and poetry. In that year, the pope also donated a golden iron Greek Cross to Dante's burial site in Ravenna, on the occasion of the 700th anniversary of his birth. The same cross was blessed by Pope Francis in October 2020.

In 2007, a reconstruction of Dante's face was undertaken in a collaborative project. Artists from the University of Pisa and forensic engineers at the University of Bologna at Forlì constructed the model, portraying Dante's features as somewhat different from what was once thought.

In 2008, the Municipality of Florence officially apologized for expelling Dante 700 years earlier. In May 2021, a symbolic re-trial was held virtually in Florence to posthumously clear his name.

A celebration was held in 2015 at Italy's Senate of the Republic for the 750th anniversary of Dante's birth. It included a commemoration from Pope Francis, who also issued the apostolic letter Candor lucis aeternae in honor of the anniversary.

== Works ==
=== Overview ===
Most of Dante's literary work was composed after his exile in 1301. La Vita Nuova ("The New Life") is the only major work that predates it; it is a collection of lyric poems (sonnets and songs) with commentary in prose, intended to be circulated in manuscript form, as was customary for such poems. It also contains the story of his love for Beatrice Portinari, who later served as the ultimate symbol of salvation in the Divine Comedy. Beatrice plays a similar role in La Vita Nuova. The work contains many of Dante's love poems in Tuscan, which was not unprecedented; the vernacular had been regularly used for lyric works before, all during the thirteenth century. However, Dante's commentary on his own work is also in the vernacular—both in the Vita Nuova and in the Convivio ("The Banquet"), an unfinished work of his—instead of the Latin that was almost universally used at the time.

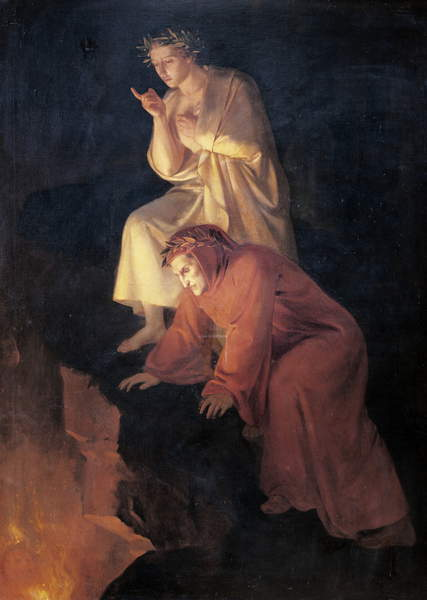
Dante and Virgil visiting Hell, as depicted in Inferno, painted by Rafael Flores, 1855

The Divine Comedy describes Dante's journey through Hell (Inferno), Purgatory (Purgatorio), and Paradise (Paradiso); he is first guided by the Roman poet Virgil and then by Beatrice. Of the books, Purgatorio is arguably the most lyrical of the three, referring to more contemporary poets and artists than Inferno; Paradiso is the most heavily theological, and the one in which, many scholars have argued, the Divine Comedy's most beautiful and mystic passages appear.

He wrote the Comedy in a language he called "Italian", an amalgamated literary language predominantly based on the regional dialect of Tuscany, but with some elements of Latin and other regional dialects. He deliberately aimed to reach a readership throughout Italy, including laymen, clergymen, and other poets. By writing a lofty, serious poem in this language, he established that it was suitable for formal works. Unlike Boccaccio, Milton or Ariosto, Dante did not become an author read across Europe until the Romantic era. Throughout the 19th century, Dante's reputation grew and solidified; and by 1865, the 600th anniversary of his birth, he had become established as one of the greatest literary icons of the Western world.

Although in a modern context the term comedy may seem out of place, in the classical sense the word comedy refers to works that reflect belief in an ordered universe, in which events tend toward not only a happy or amusing ending but one influenced by some will that orders all things to an ultimate good. By this meaning of the word, as Dante wrote in a letter to Cangrande, the progression of the pilgrimage from Hell to Paradise is the exemplary expression of comedy, as the work begins with the pilgrim's moral confusion and ends with the vision of God.

A number of other works are credited to Dante. Convivio ("The Banquet") is a collection of his longest poems with an (unfinished) allegorical commentary. Monarchia ("Monarchy") is a summary treatise of political philosophy in Latin which was condemned and burned after Dante's death by the Papal Legate Bertrando del Poggetto; it argues for the necessity of a universal or global monarchy to establish universal peace in this life, and this monarchy's relationship to the Roman Catholic Church as guide to eternal peace. De vulgari eloquentia ("On the Eloquence in the Vernacular") is a treatise on vernacular literature, partly inspired by the Razos de trobar of Raimon Vidal de Bezaudun. Quaestio de aqua et terra ("A Question of the Water and of the Land") is a theological work discussing the arrangement of Earth's dry land and ocean. The Eclogues are two poems addressed to the poet Giovanni del Virgilio. Dante is also sometimes credited with writing Il Fiore ("The Flower"), a series of sonnets summarizing Le Roman de la Rose, and Detto d'Amore ("Tale of Love"), a short narrative poem also based on Le Roman de la Rose. These would be the earliest, and most novice, of his known works. Le Rime is a posthumous collection of miscellaneous poems.

=== List of works ===
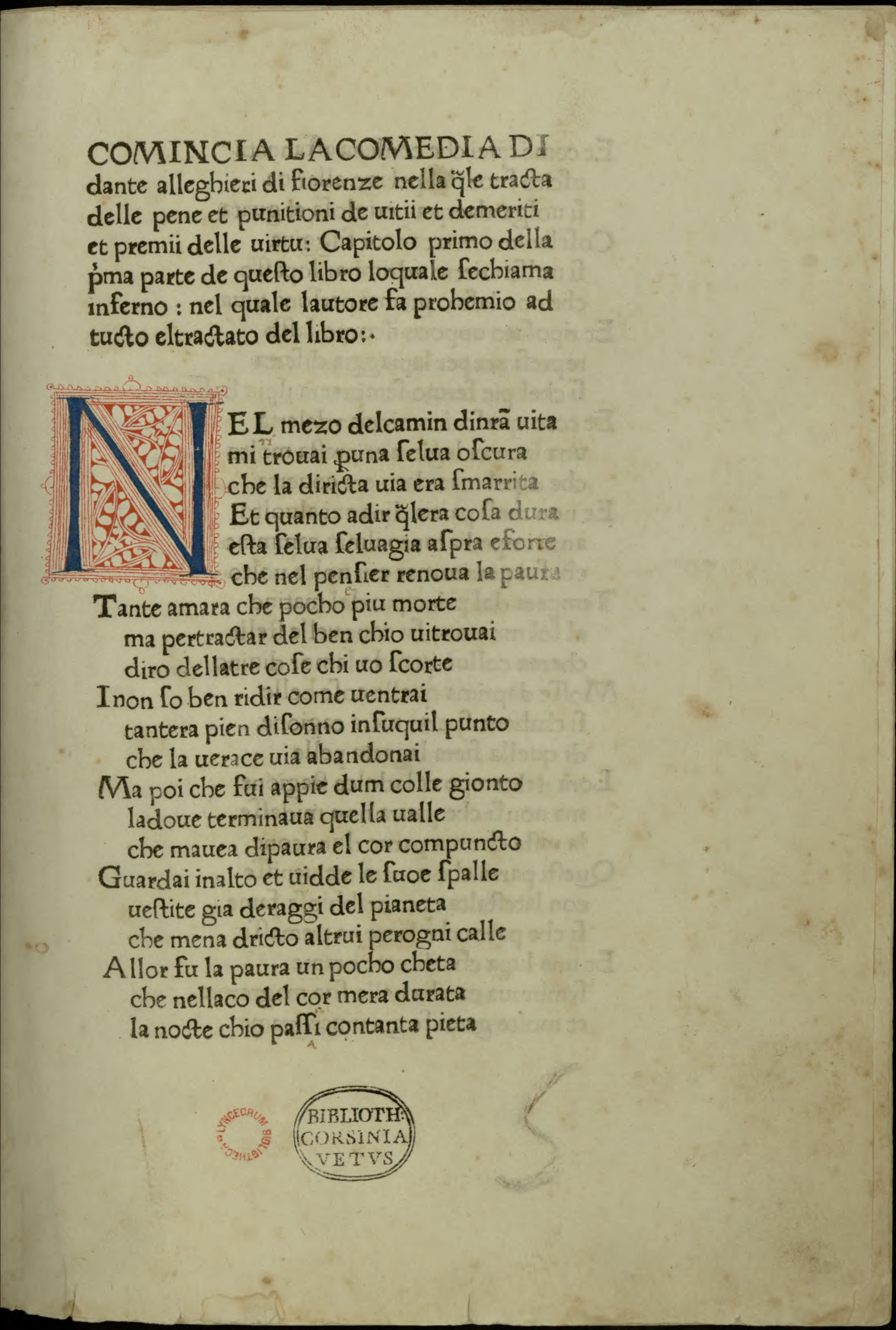
Divina Commedia (1472)

The major works of Dante include the following:

- Il Fiore and Detto d'Amore ("The Flower" and "Tale of Love", 1283–87)
- La Vita Nuova ("The New Life", 1294)
- De vulgari eloquentia ("On Eloquence in the Vernacular", 1302–05)
- Convivio ("The Banquet", 1307)
- Monarchia ("Monarchy", 1313)
- Divine Comedy (1320)
- Eclogues (1320)
- Quaestio de aqua et terra ("A Question About the Water and the Land", 1320)
- Le Rime ("The Rhymes")

=== Collections ===
Dante's works reside in cultural institutions across the world. Many items have been digitized or are available for public consultation.

- Dante's House Museum (Florence, Italy) opened in Dante's residence in 1965 and was refurbished in 2020.
- Princeton University Library (New Jersey, US) holds 160 volumes of Dante's works and books about his life, including two 15th-century editions of the Divine Comedy.
- University College London Special Collections (London, UK) holds c. 3,000 volumes of material by and about Dante, including 36 editions of the Divine Comedy. The collection was bequeathed to the university by the scholar Henry Clark Barlow in 1876.
- The Beinecke Rare Book and Manuscript Library (Yale University Library, Connecticut, US) holds a manuscript edition of the Divine Comedy (c. 1385–1400).

== See also ==
- Dantedì
- Dante Alighieri Society

== Citations ==
=== References ===
- Barbero, Alessandro (2022) [Italian original publication: 2021]. Dante: A Life. Translated by Cameron, Allan. Pegasus Books. ISBN 9781643139142.
- Harrison, Robert (February 19, 2015). "Dante on Trial". NY Review of Books. pp. 36–37.
- Raffa, Guy P. (2020). Dante's Bones: How a Poet Invented Italy. Cambridge, Massachusetts: Belknap Press. ISBN 978-0-674-98083-9.
- Santagata, Marco (2016) [Italian original publication: 2012]. Dante: The Story of His Life. Translated by Dixon, Richard. Harvard University Press. ISBN 9780674504868.
- Shaw, Prue (2014). Reading Dante: From Here to Eternity. Liveright. ISBN 9780871407801.
- Took, John (2021). Dante. Princeton University Press. ISBN 9780691208930.
