= Gemma Donati =

Wife of Dante Alighieri

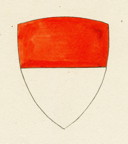
- The Donati coat of arms
- Born: Gemma di Manetto Donati c. 3 March 1265; Florence, Republic of Florence
- Died: after 1333 (aged 68 or over)
- Spouse: Dante Alighieri
- Children: at least 4, including Jacopo Alighieri

Gemma di Manetto Donati (c. 3 March 1265 – after 1333), commonly shortened to Gemma Donati, was the wife of Italian poet Dante Alighieri.

== Biography ==
Gemma Donati's life is relatively undocumented. Dante's extant writings make no mention of Donati. Instead he wrote prolifically about his love-interest and muse Beatrice Portinari, whom he met when he was nine.

Donati was born to Manetto and Maria Donati in around 1267, two years after her future husband, Dante Alighieri. The Donati family was a wealthy family in medieval Florence. She was betrothed to Dante in 1277 when he was either 11 or 12 years old. Her dowry was only 200 florins, which suggests that Dante's family had no substantial assets by the mid-1270s. Nevertheless, an alliance with the Donati family through marriage was socially prestigious. Since the Donati family owned a lot of land in Florence and made money through renting, it is very likely that the Donatis were the landlords of the Alighieri home. The couple were married sometime around 1285 while they were in their early 20s.

Accounts vary as to how many children Donati and Dante had, but they had at least four children:

- Pietro (c. 1285)
- Giovanni (c. 1288)
- Jacopo (c. 1289)
- Antonia (c. 1300)

There has been discussion among scholars of whether or not the marriage between Donati and Dante was a happy one. In Boccaccio's Trattatello in laude di Dante, Boccaccio writes that Dante's relationship with Donati only brought him trouble and pain. Despite this claim, there is no firm evidence that the marriage was not a happy one. There is evidence that Dante was on good terms with Donati's family, as in the 1290s Manetto Donati gave Dante several loans.

When Dante was exiled from Florence in 1301, Donati and her children did not join him, and it is probable that Donati never saw her husband again. She entered a convent in Ravenna later in her life. Documents suggest that as of June 1333 she was alive; however, her exact death date is unknown.

Dante would represent her as the Virgin Mary in the Canto XXIII of the Paradiso, as "introduction" to the representation of their children Pietro, Jacopo, Giovanni, represented in the following Cantos by the respective saints, and Antonia, represented by Beatrice and Adamo.
