= Bucranium =

Decorative stone carving of an ox skull

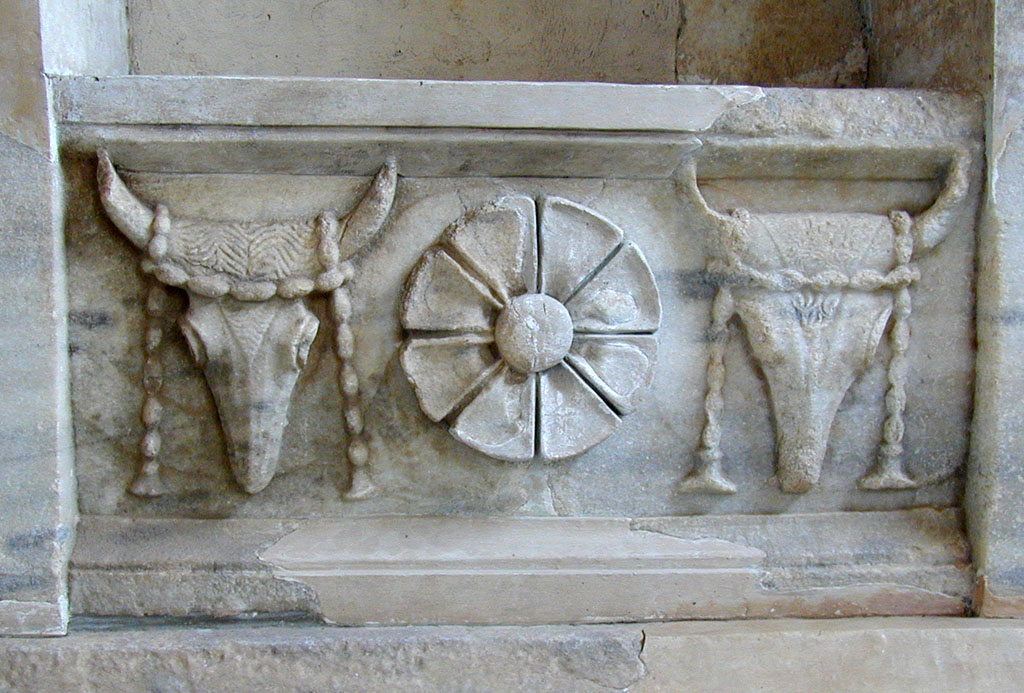
Garlanded bucrania on a frieze from the Samothrace temple complex

Bucranium (pl. bucrania; from Latin būcrānium, from Ancient Greek βουκράνιον (boukránion) 'ox's head', referring to the skull of an ox) was a form of carved decoration commonly used in Classical architecture. The name is generally considered to originate with the practice of displaying garlanded, sacrificial oxen, whose heads were displayed on the walls of temples, a practice dating back to the sophisticated Neolithic site of Çatalhöyük in eastern Anatolia, where cattle skulls were overlaid with white plaster.

== Etymology and usage ==
The word "bucranium" (Latin bucranium) comes from Ancient Greek: βουκράνιον – being composed of βοῦς (ox) and κρανίον (skull) – and literally means "ox skull". Similarly, the Greek word αἰγικράνιον (Latin aegicranium) means a "goat skull", also used as a decorative element in architecture.

The technical term "bucranium" was originally used in the description of classical architecture. Its application to the field of prehistoric archeology is relatively recent and is mainly due to the work of the British archaeologist James Mellaart dedicated to the Neolithic site of Çatalhöyük. In 1977, Glyn Daniel established this new meaning of the term, introducing it into the Illustrated Encyclopedia of Archeology.

== Overview ==
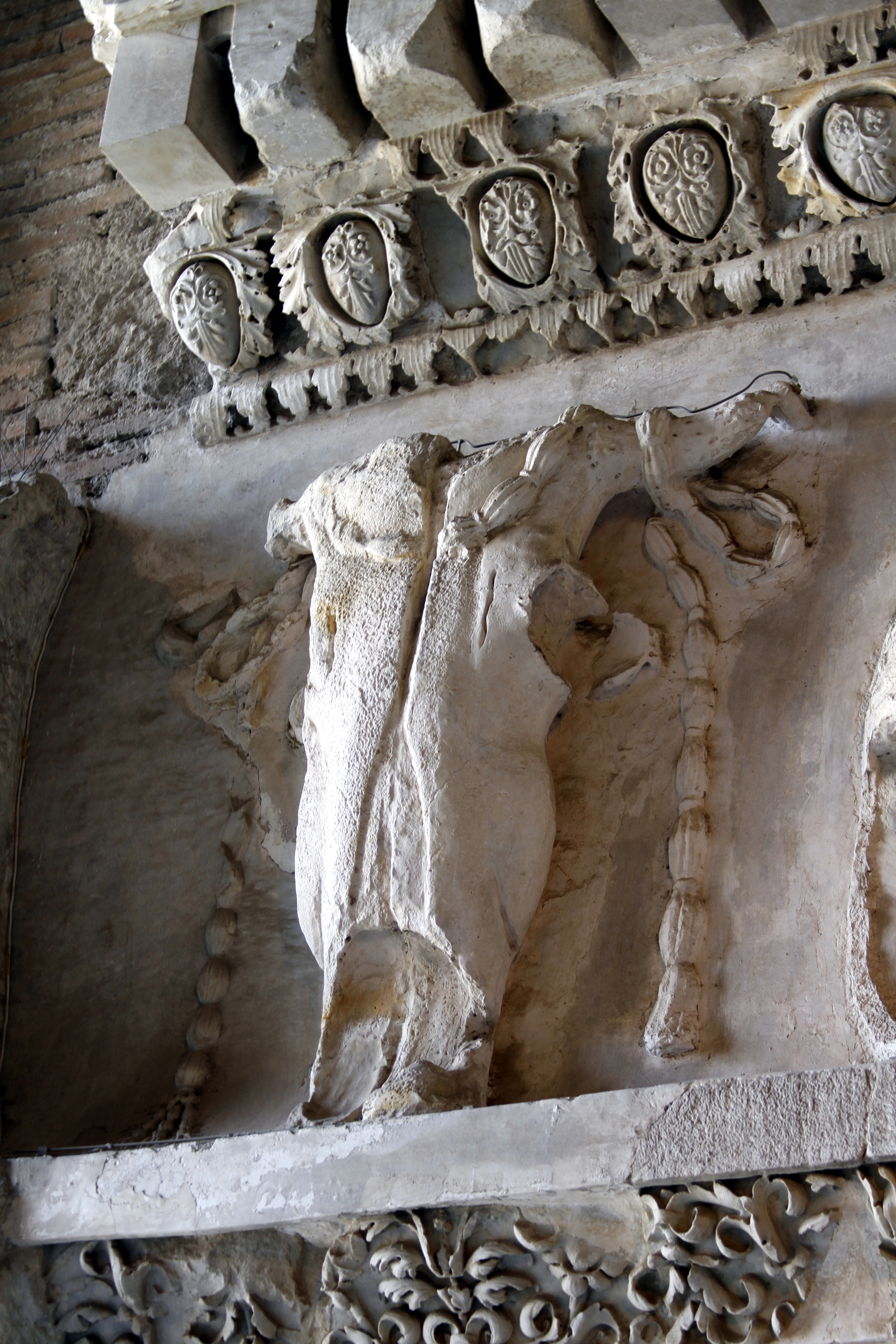
Bucranium on the frieze of the Temple of Vespasian and Titus in Rome

In ancient Rome, bucrania were frequently used as metopes between the triglyphs on the friezes of temples designed with the Doric order of architecture. They were also used in bas-relief or painted decor to adorn marble altars, often draped or decorated with garlands of fruit or flowers, many of which have survived.

A rich and festive Doric order was employed at the Basilica Aemilia on the Roman Forum; enough of it was standing for Giuliano da Sangallo to make a drawing, c 1520, reconstructing the facade (Codex Vaticano Barberiniano Latino 4424); the alternation of the shallow libation dishes called paterae with bucrania in the metopes reinforced the solemn sacrificial theme.

While the presence of bucrania was typically used with the Doric order, the Romans were not strict about this. In a first-century fresco from Boscoreale, protected by the eruption of Mount Vesuvius and now at the Metropolitan Museum of Art, bucrania and cistae mysticae hang on ribbons from pegs that support garlands, evoking joyous fasti. At the Temple of Vesta, Tivoli, designed using the Corinthian order, motifs interpreted by the architect Andrea Palladio as conventional skull bucrania adorn the frieze, although these are actually fleshed ox heads with eyes. Similarly, the Temple of Portunus in Rome, designed using the Ionic order, has bucrania in its frieze.

In later years, the motif was used to embellish buildings of the Renaissance, Baroque, and Neoclassical periods. Garlanded bucrania provide a repetitive motif in the plasterwork of the fine 18th-century Staircase Hall of The Vyne (Hampshire), inside the Pantheon at Stourhead (Wiltshire) and at Lacock Abbey (Wiltshire).

== Gallery ==
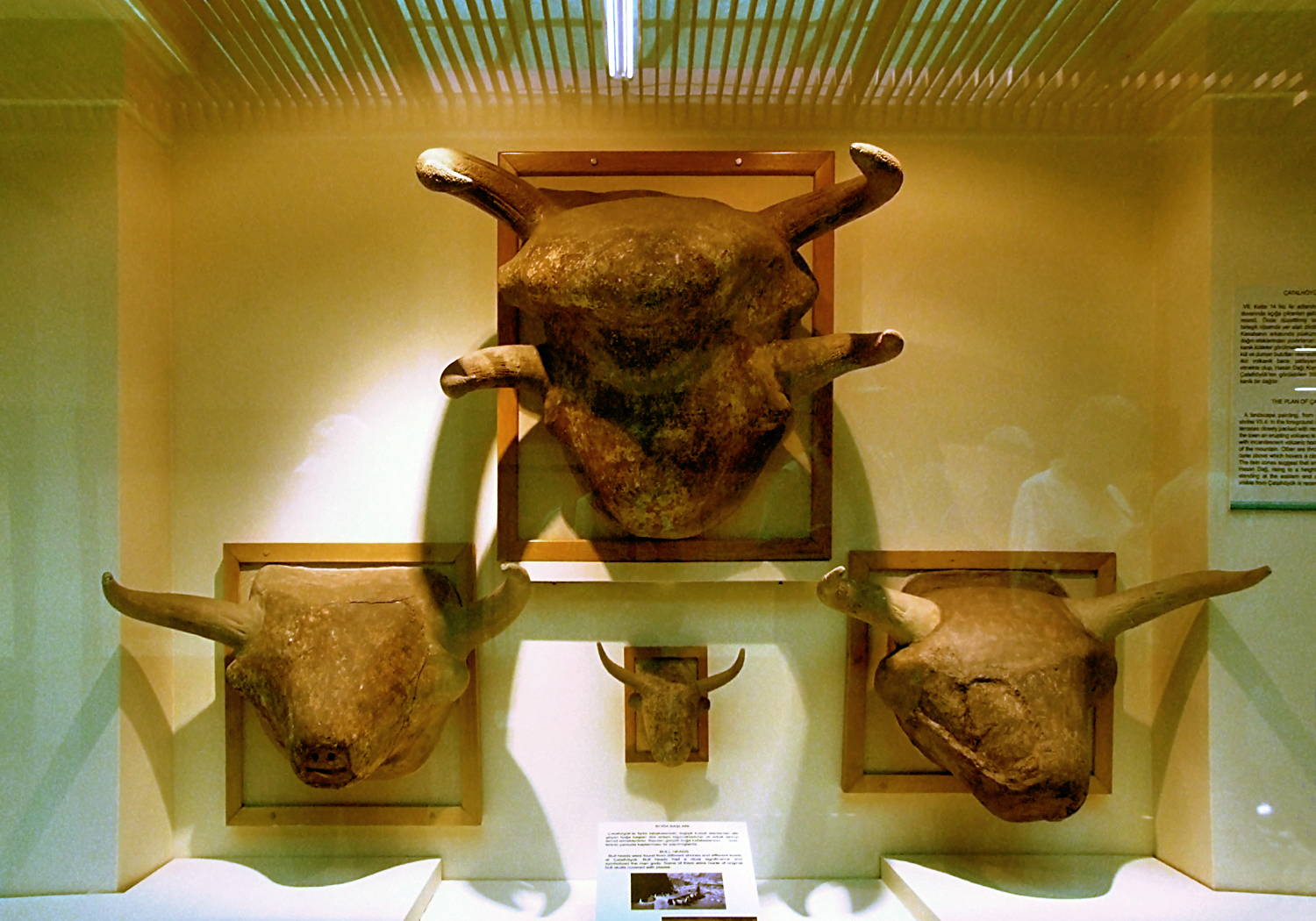
Neolithic bucrania from Çatalhöyük, 7500-6400 BC (Museum of Anatolian Civilizations, Ankara)

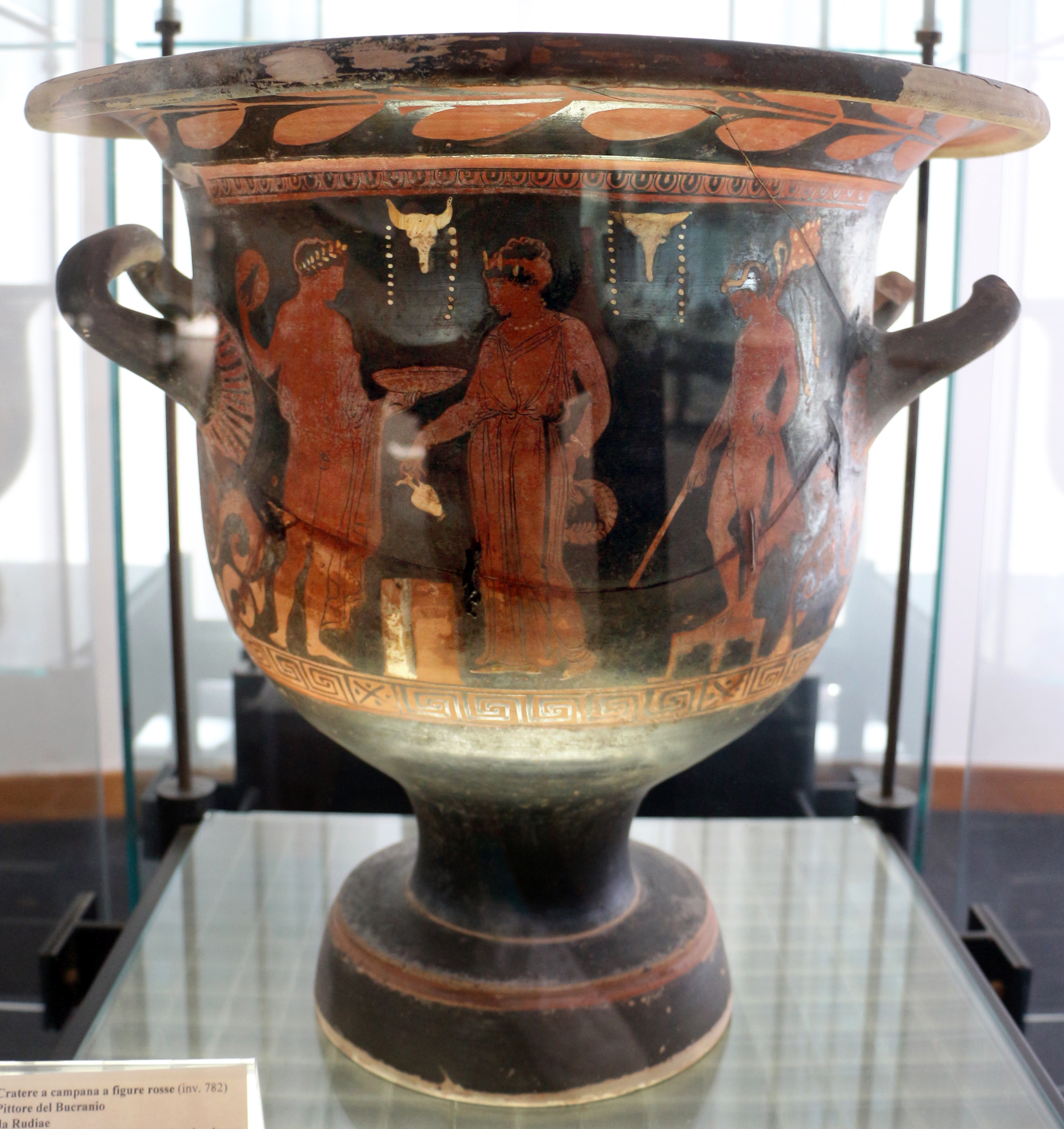
Greek bucrania on a bell krater over a sacrifice, from Rudiae c.375-350 BC (Museo archeologico Sigismondo Castromediano, Lecce)

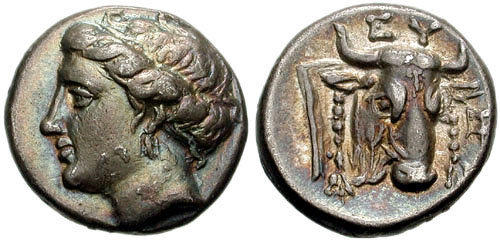
Drachma of the Euboean League, with head of the personification Euboia ("Rich in Cattle") and garlanded bucranium, 304–290 BC

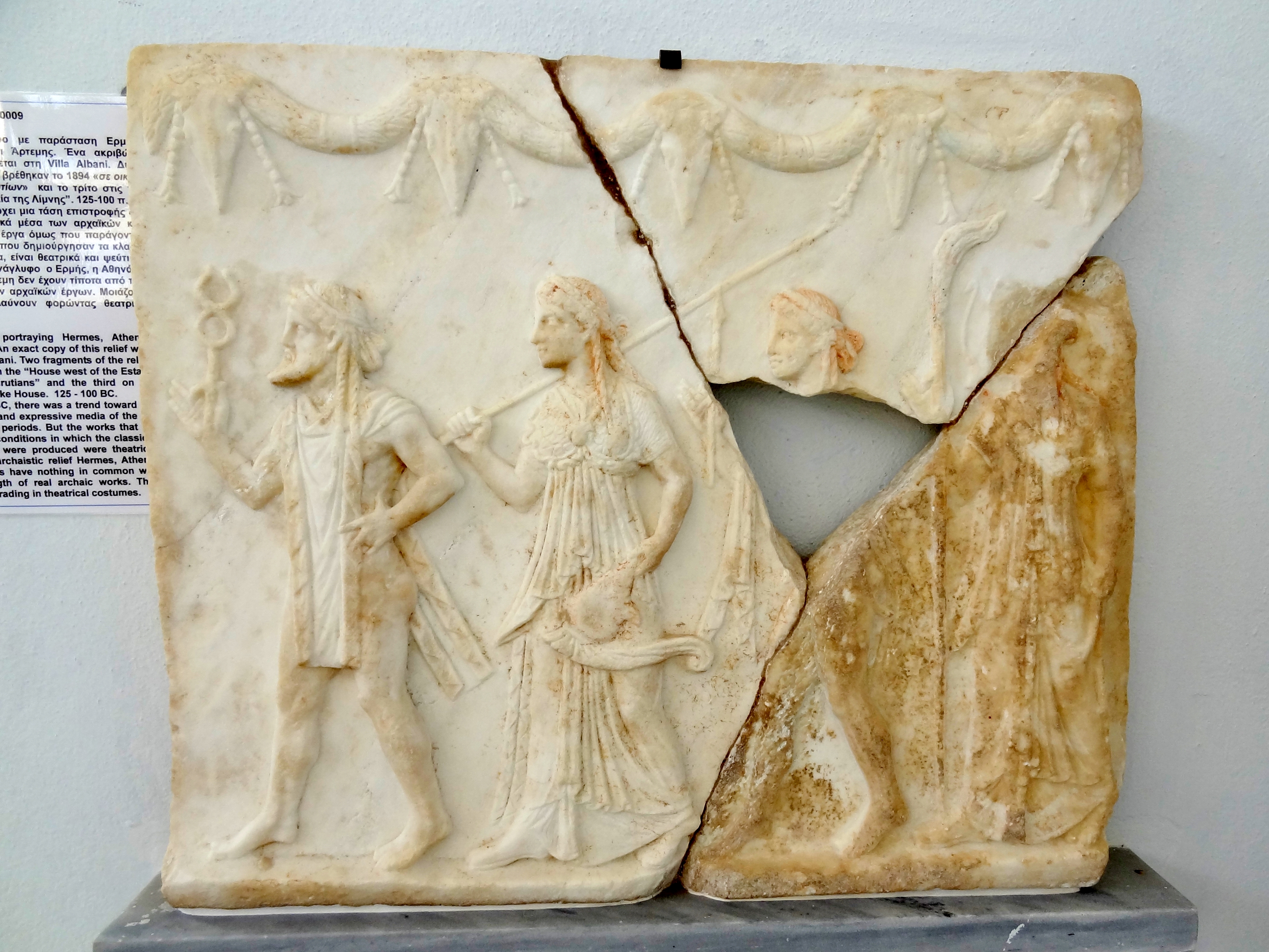
Bucrania with festoons over a procession of Hermes, Athena, Apollo and Artemis, 125-100 BC (Archaeological Museum of Delos)

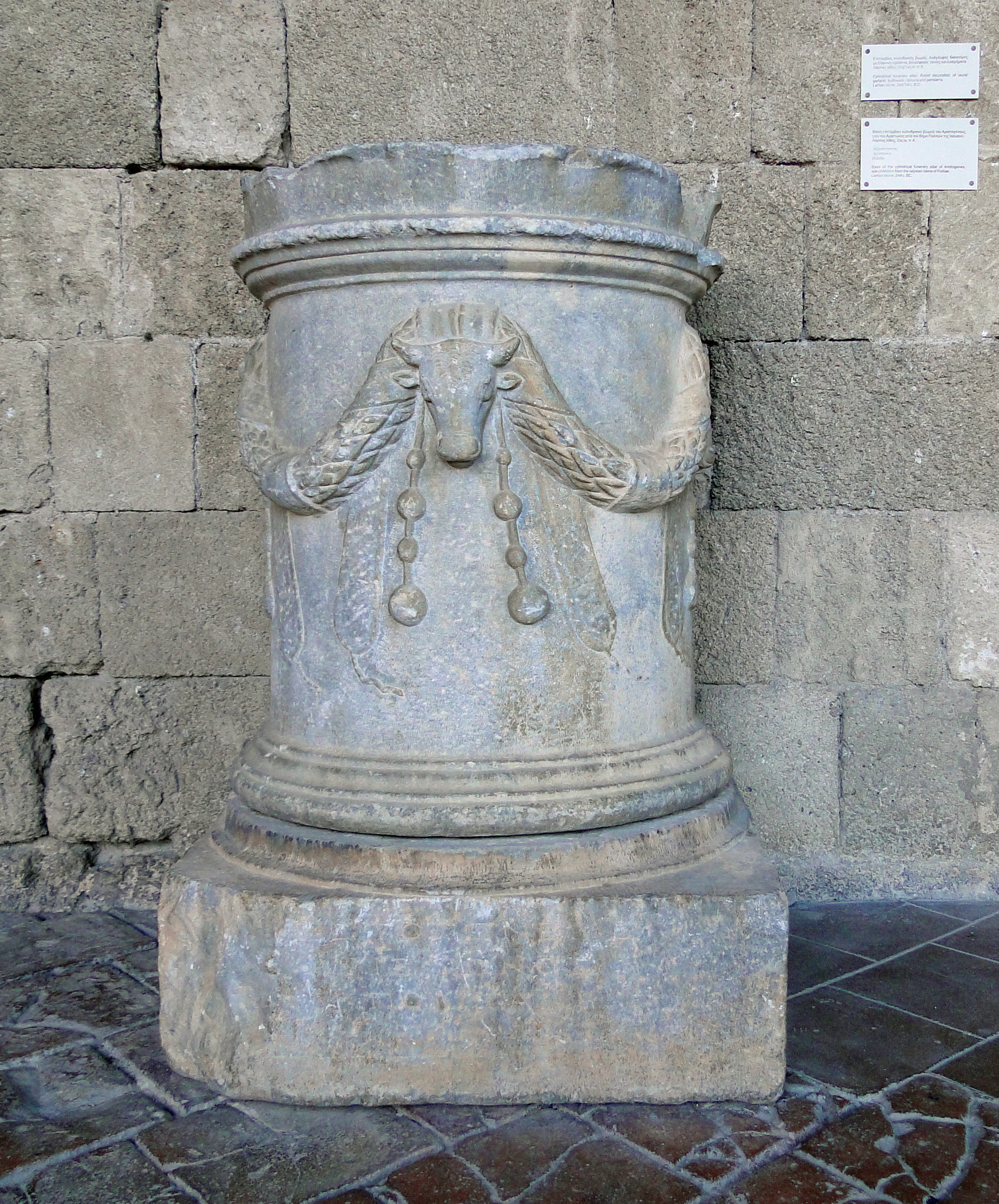
Bucrania on a funerary altar, 2nd-1st centuries BC (Archaeological Museum of Rhodes)

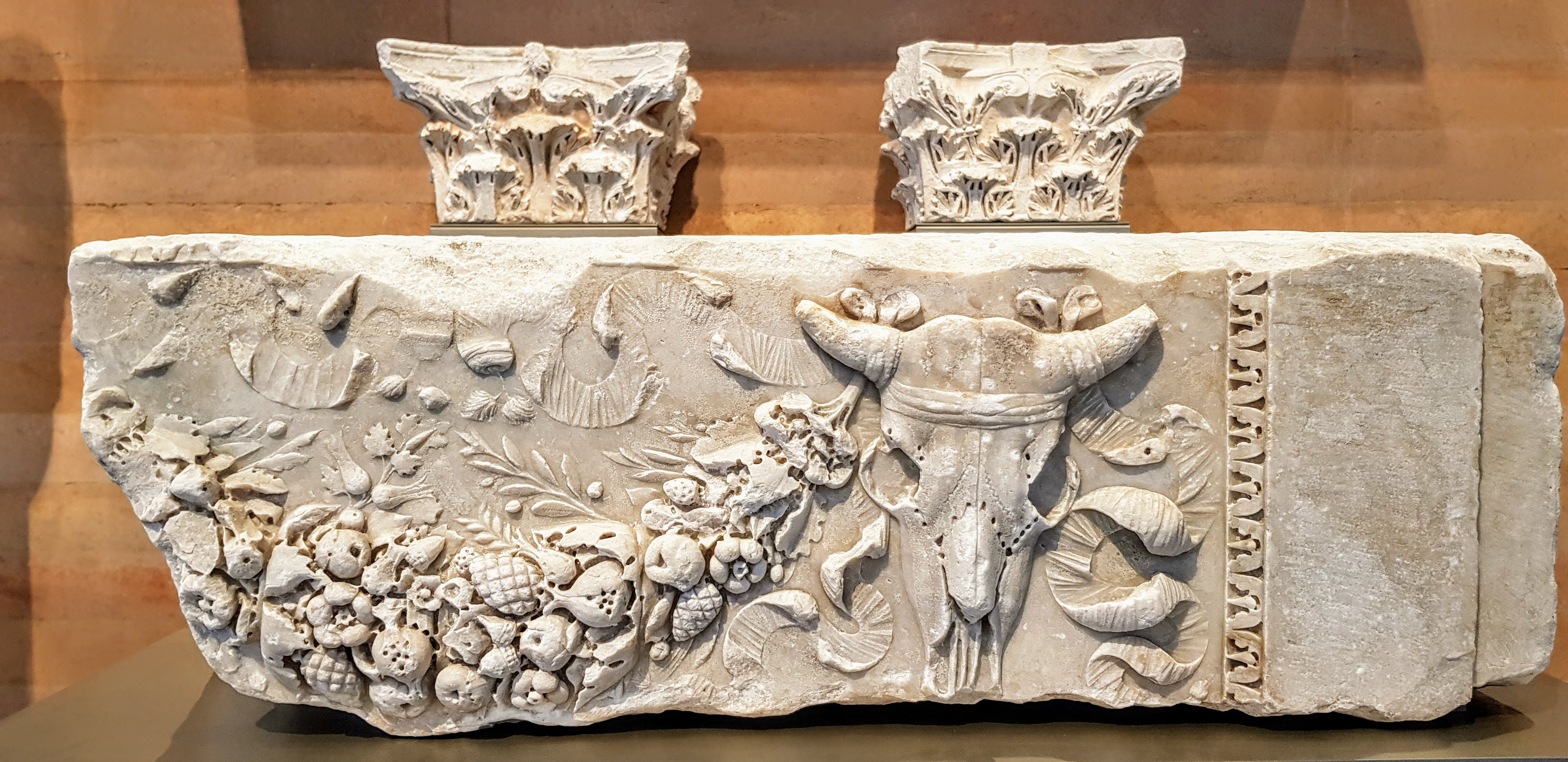
Roman bucranium with a festoon and ribbons, late 1st century (Narbo Via museum, Narbonne)

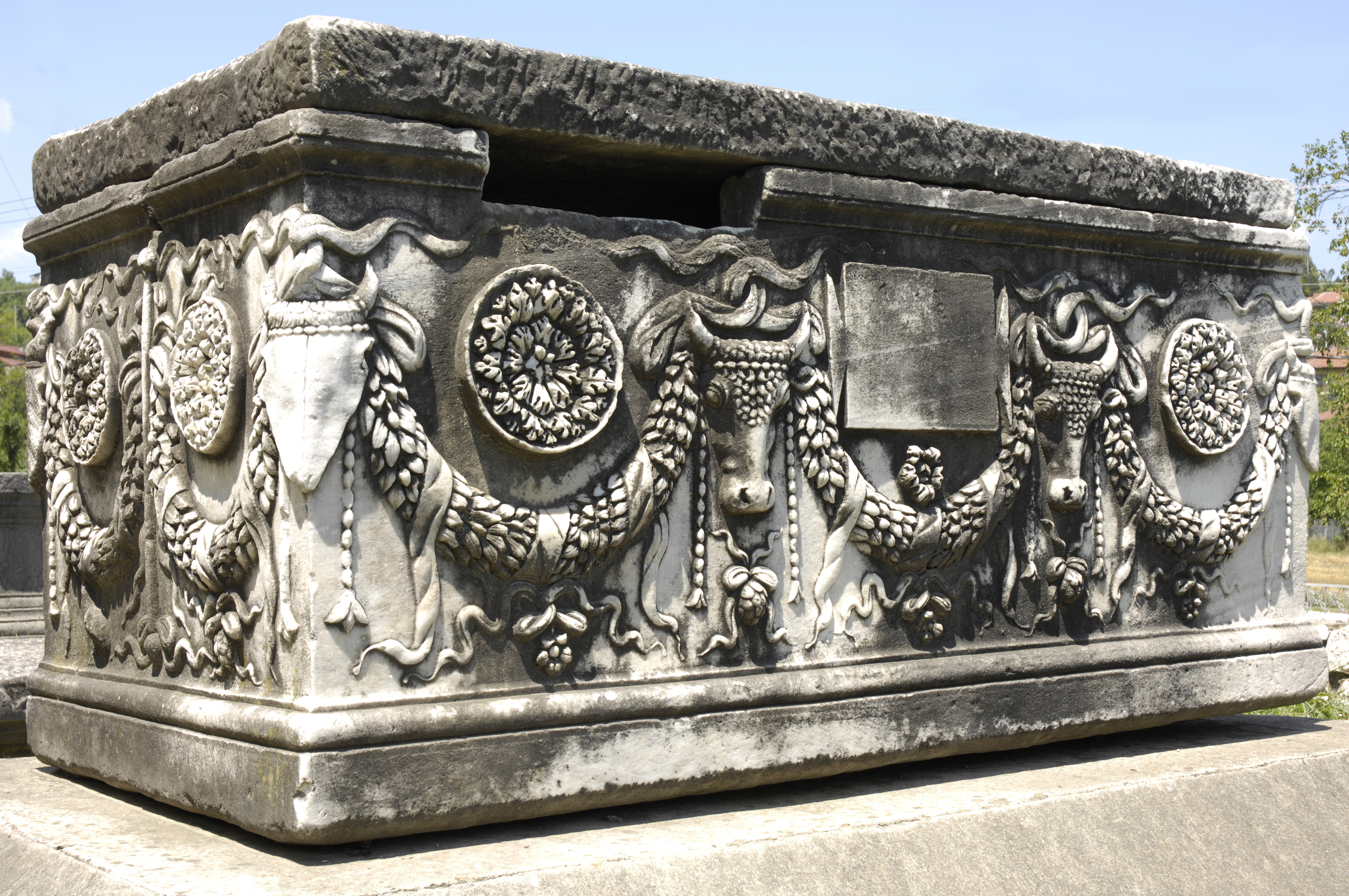
Roman-era garland sarcophagus from ancient Bithynia, 2nd century (Konuralp Museum)

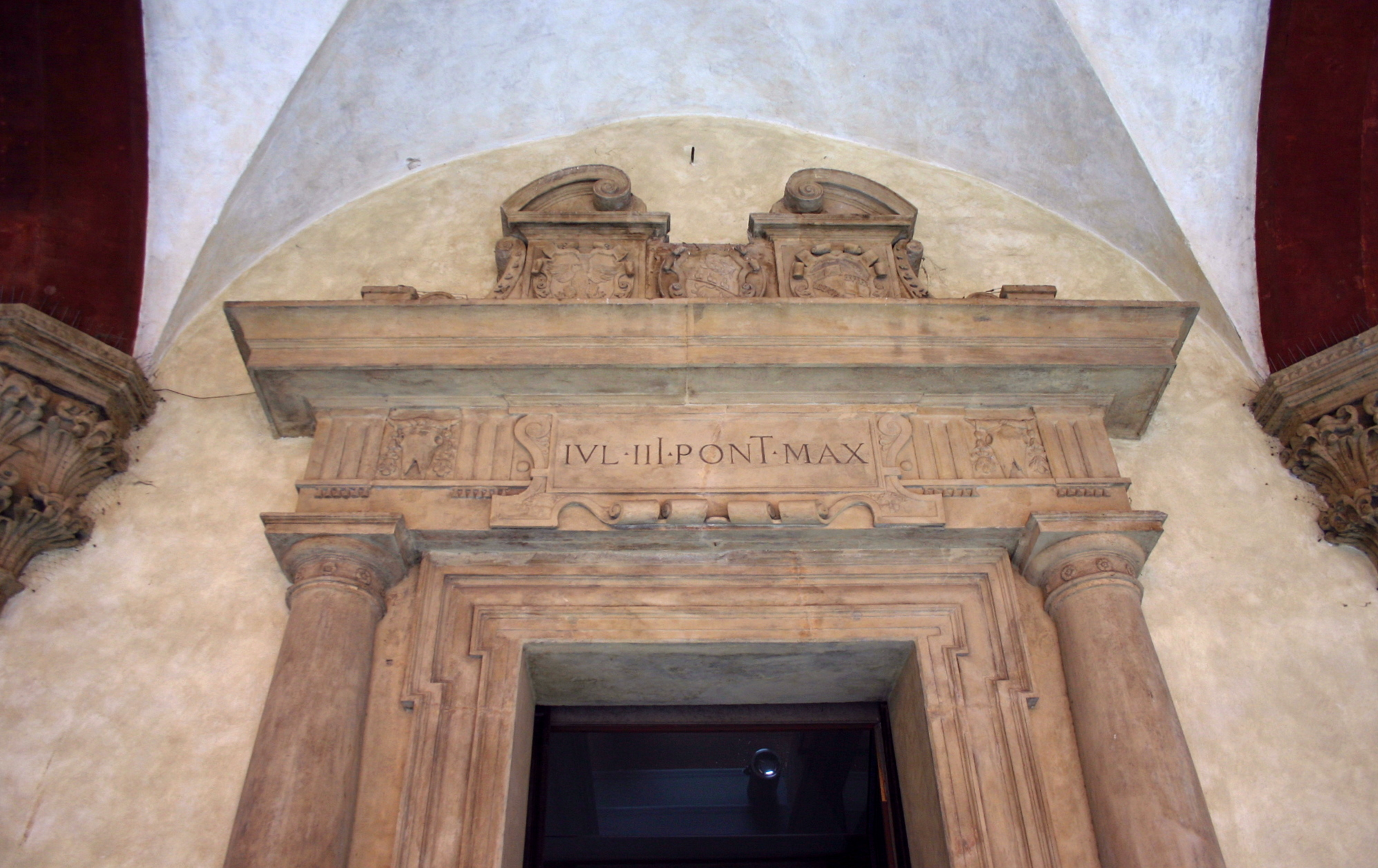
Renaissance bucrania on an entablature of the Palazzo d'Accursio, Bologna, designed by Fioravante Fioravanti, 15th century

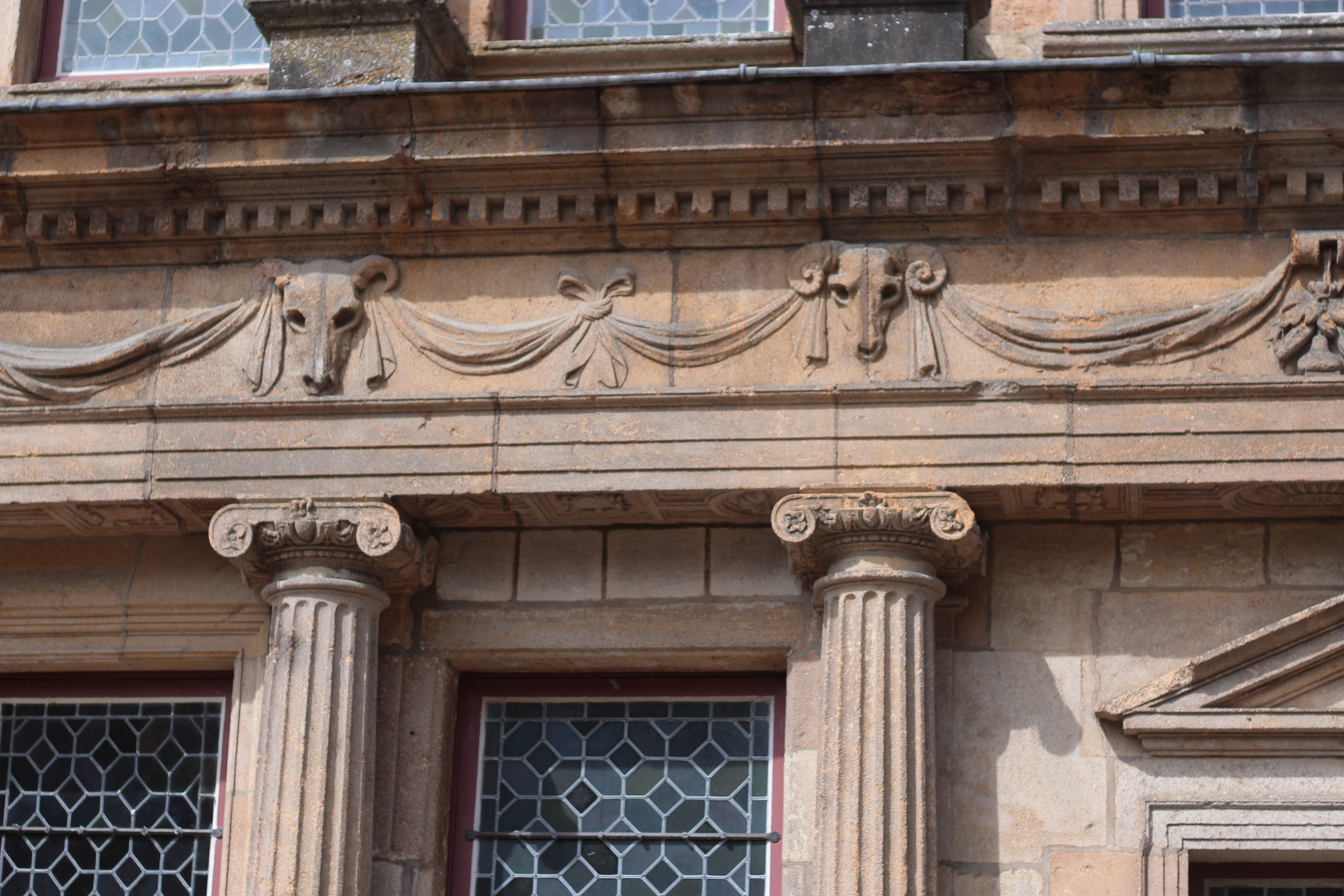
Bucrania in a frieze on Rue du Cardinal-Morlot no. 20, Langres, France, c.1550

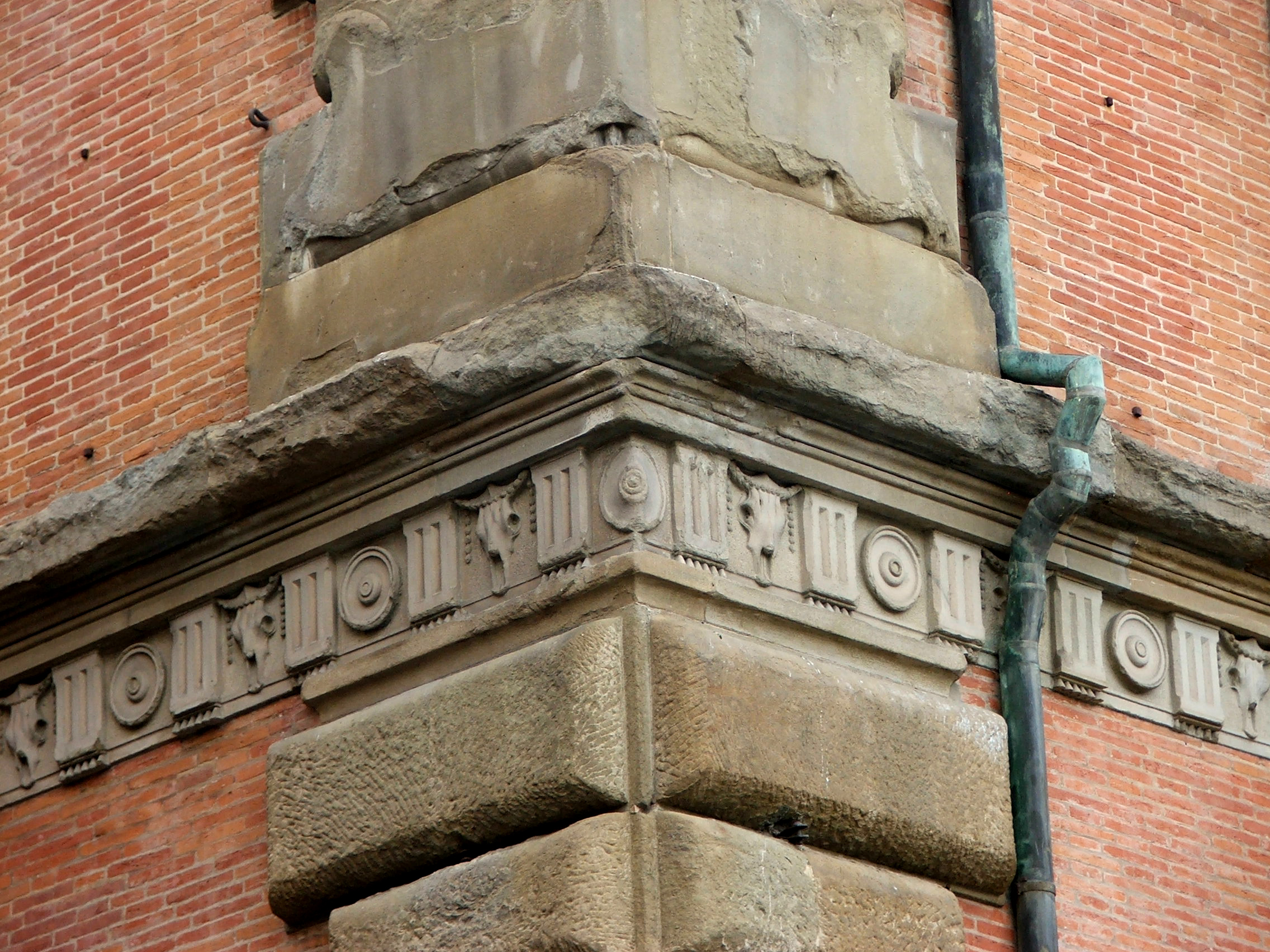
Bucrania in a frieze of the Palazzo Budini Gattai, Florence, designed by Giuliano di Baccio d'Agnolo and Bartolomeo Ammannati, 1563–1574

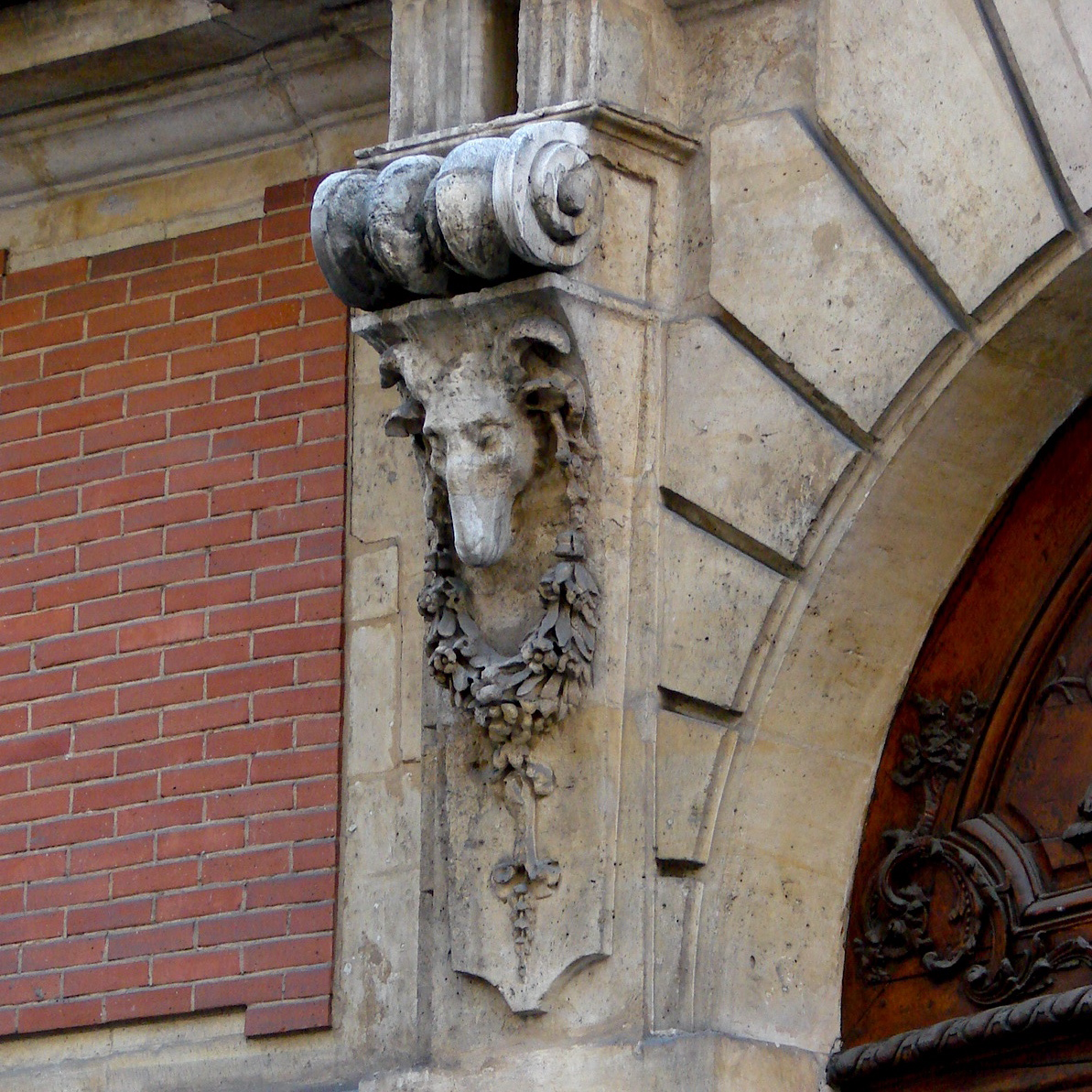
Baroque bucranium with a festoon on a corbel of the Hôtel d'Almeyras, Rue des Francs-Bourgeois no. 30, Paris, 17th century

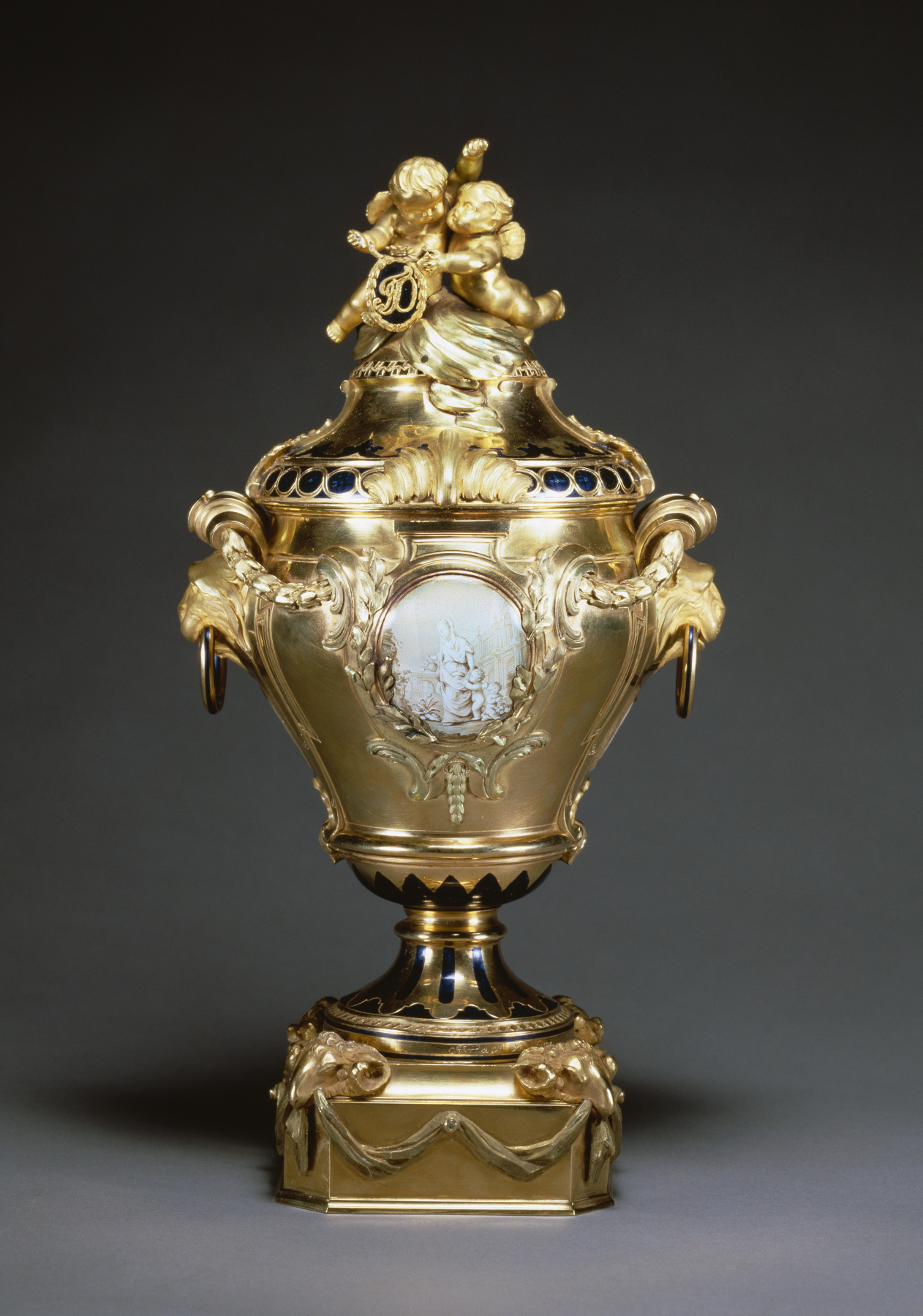
Rococo ram's head bucrania on the foot of a potpourri vase, 1768 (Walters Art Museum, Baltimore)

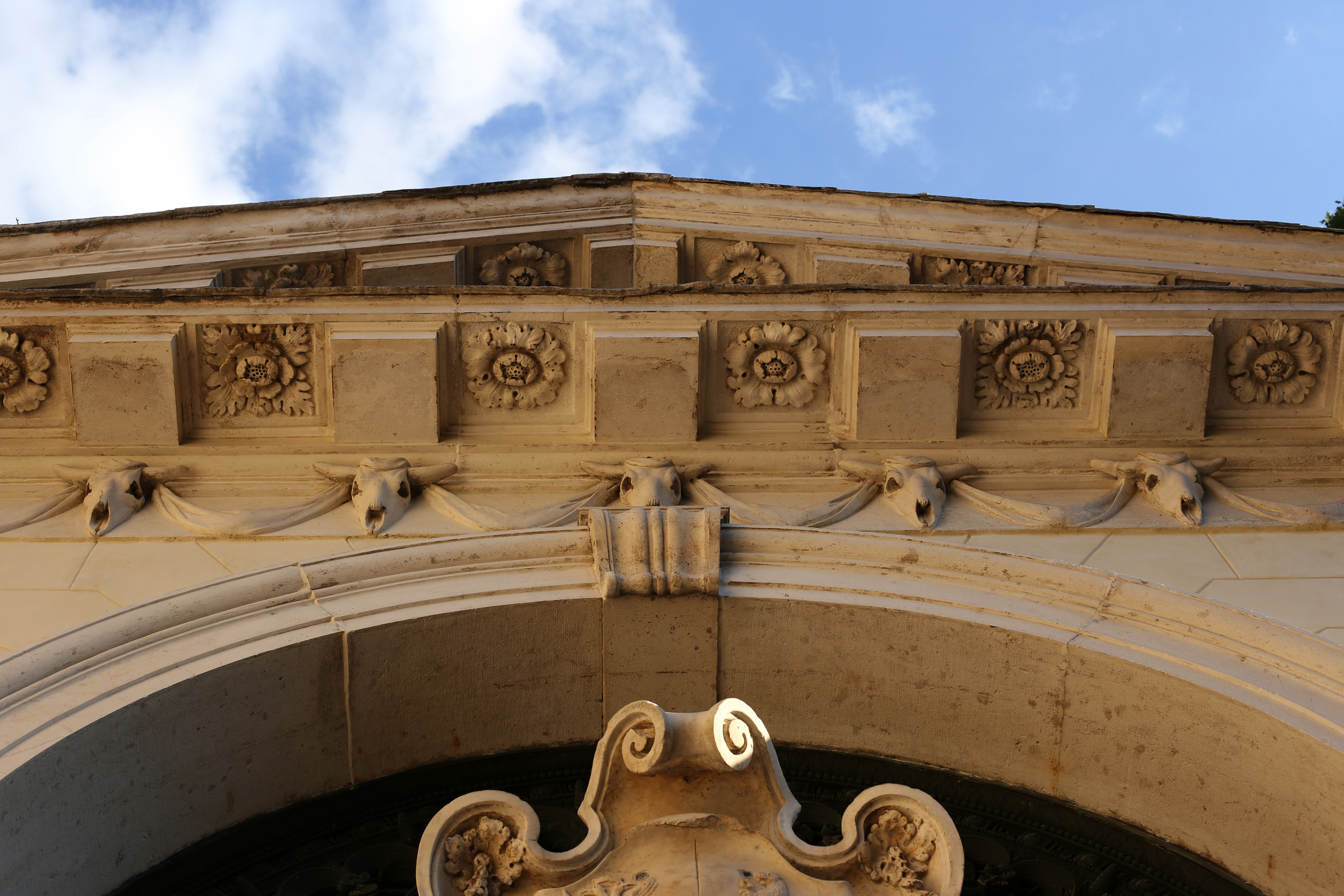
Neoclassical bucrania on the Tomb of Dante, Ravenna, by Camillo Morigia, 1780–1781

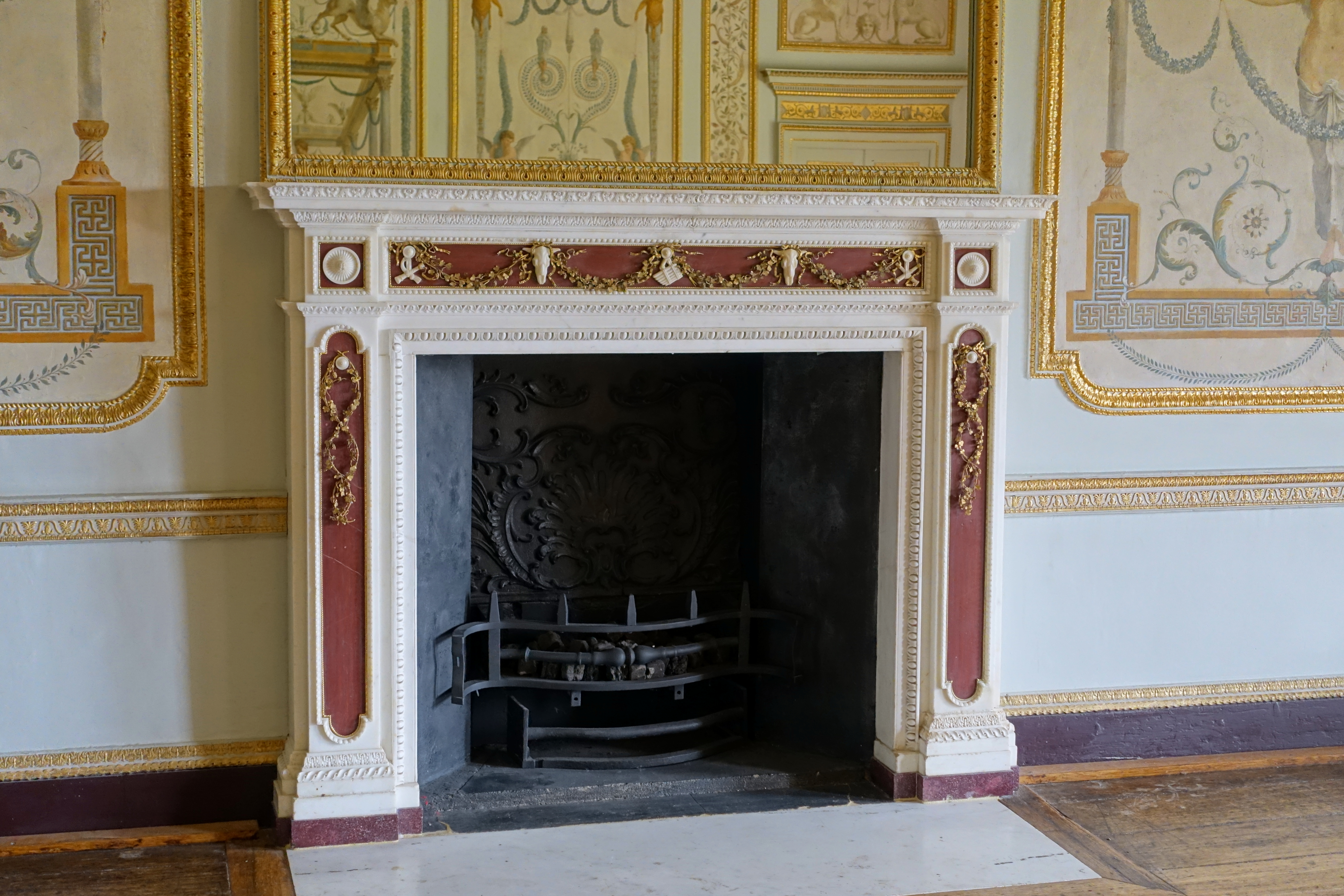
Neoclassical bucrania on the fireplace from the Music Room of the Stowe House, Stowe, Buckinghamshire, by Vincenzo Valdrè, early 1780s

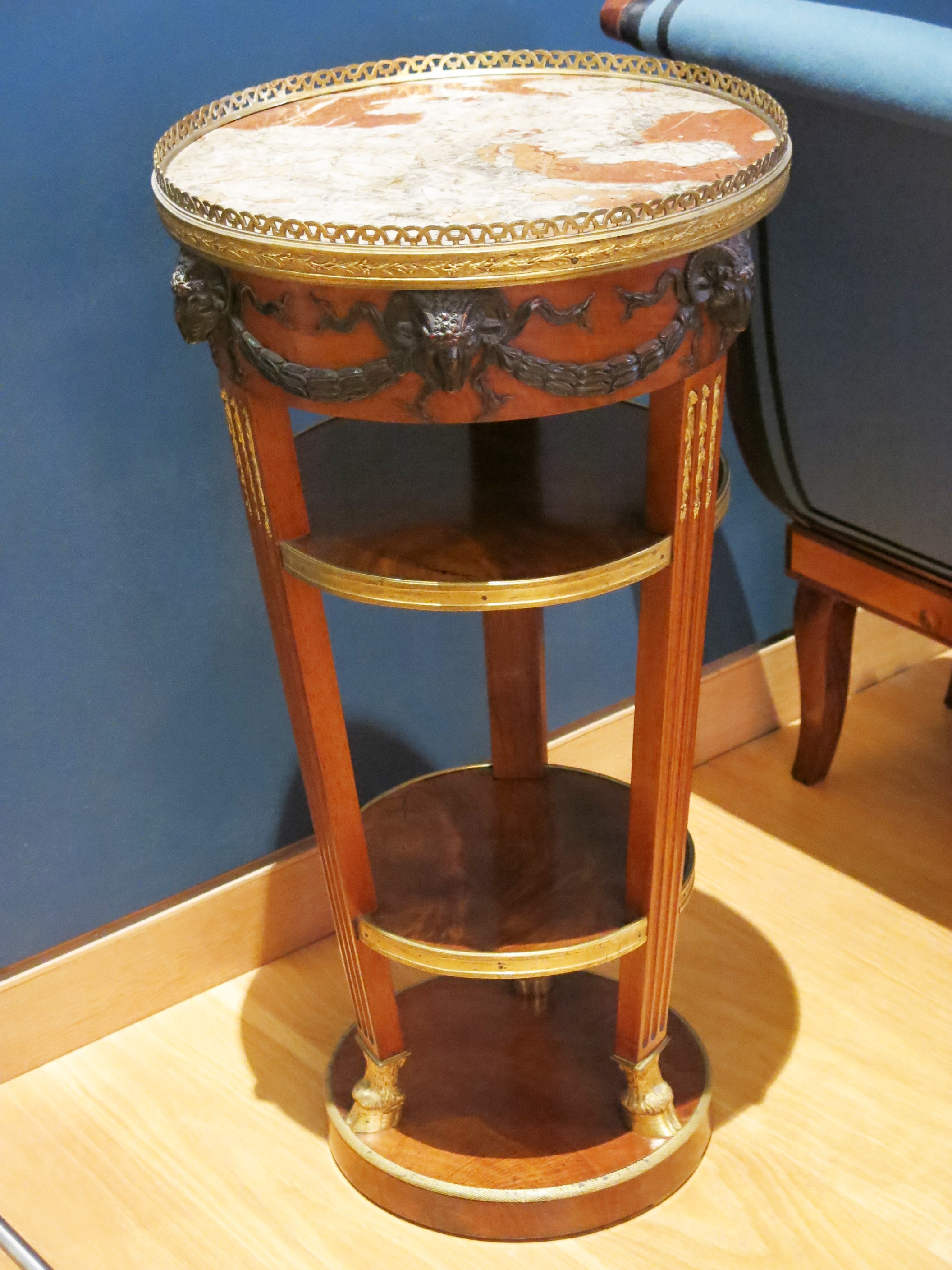
Neoclassical bucrania on a gueridon from the salon of Madame Récamier, c.1790, Louvre

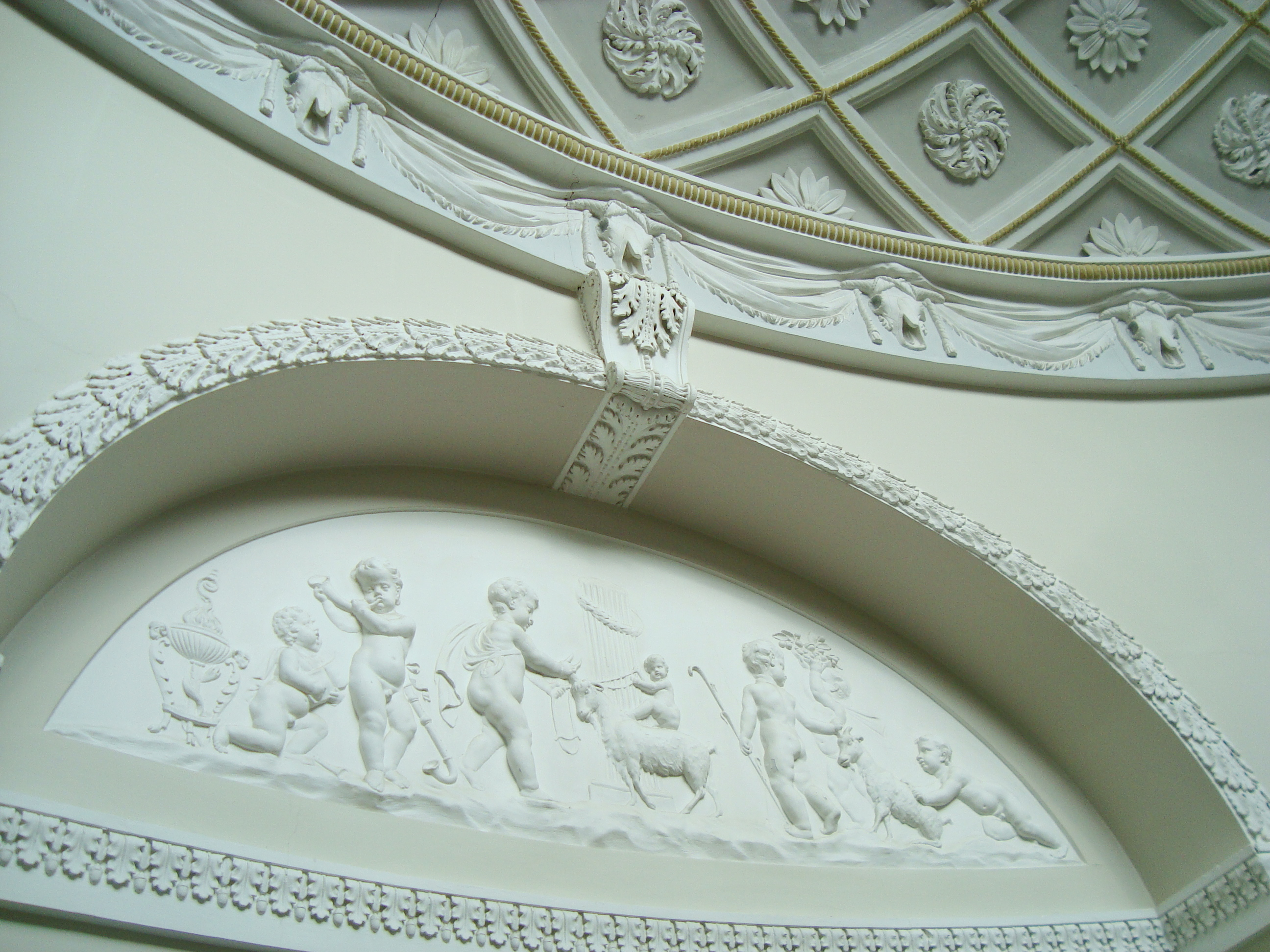
Neoclassical bucrania in the Townley Hall, Tullyallen, County Louth, Ireland, designed by Francis Johnston, 1794–1798

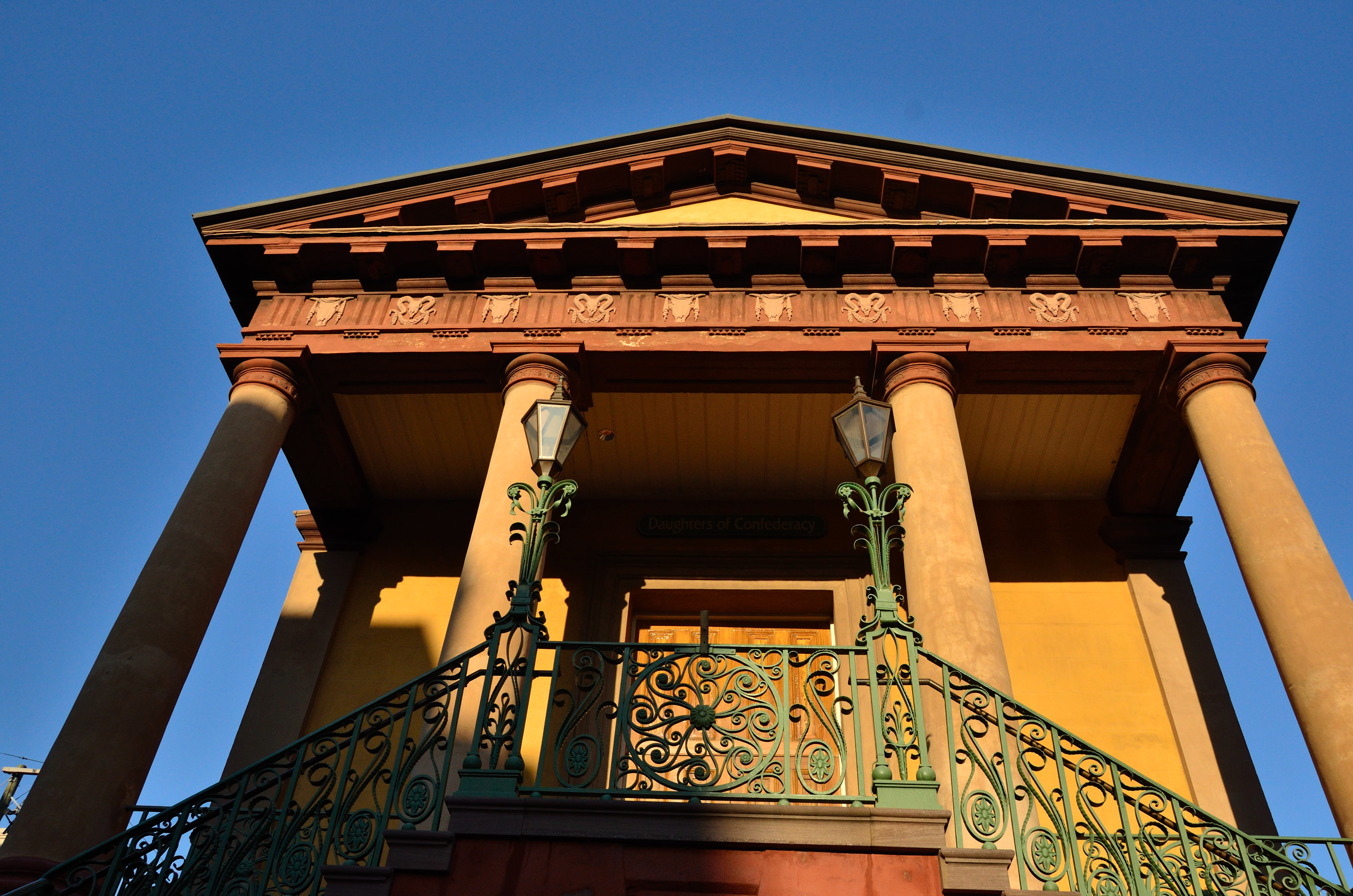
Neoclassical bucrania on the City Market, Charleston, South Carolina, US, by Edward Brickell White, 1841

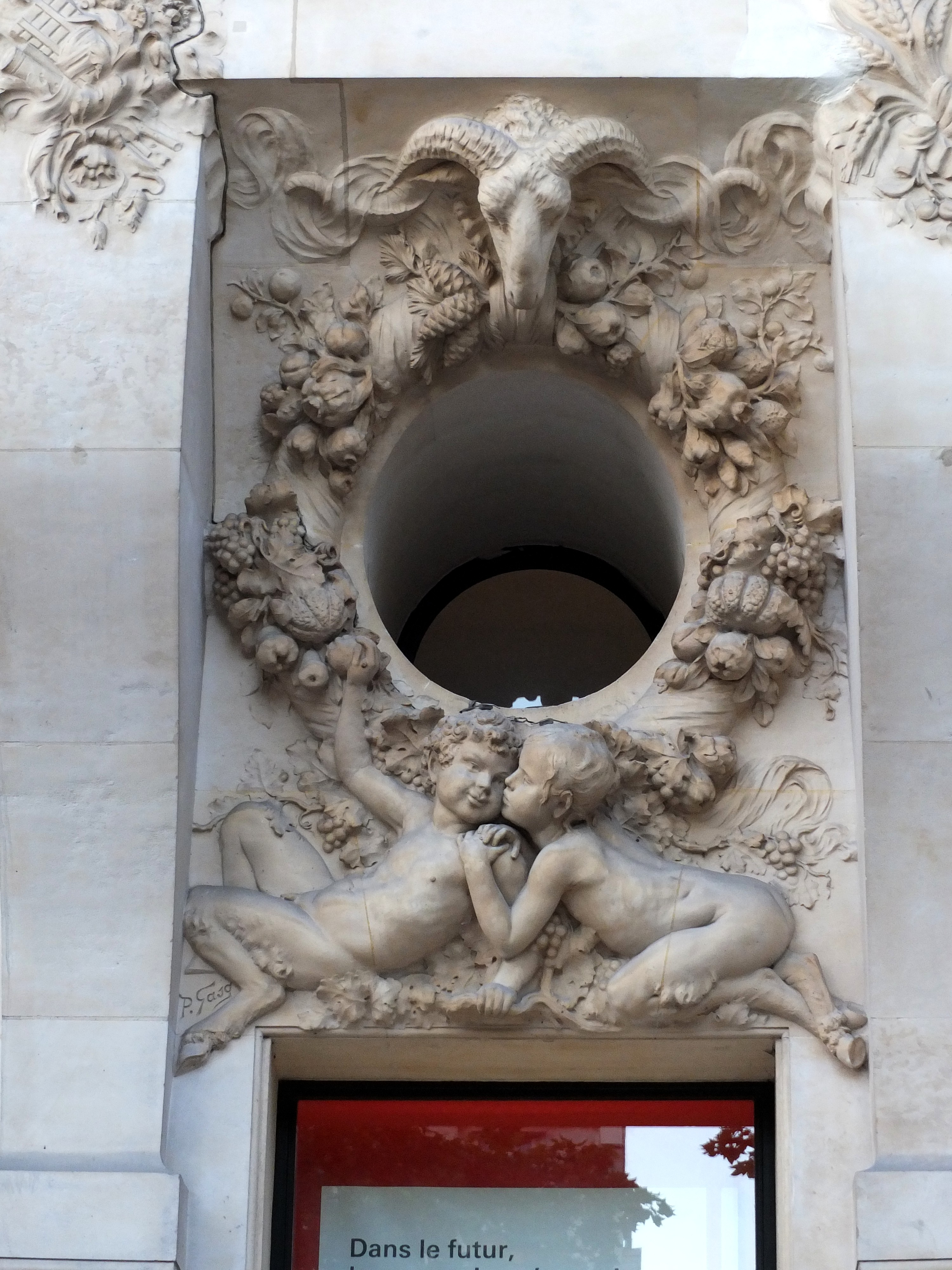
Art Nouveau bucranium, façade of Hôtel Élysée Palace, Paris, architect Georges Chedanne and sculptor Paul Gasq, 1897–1899

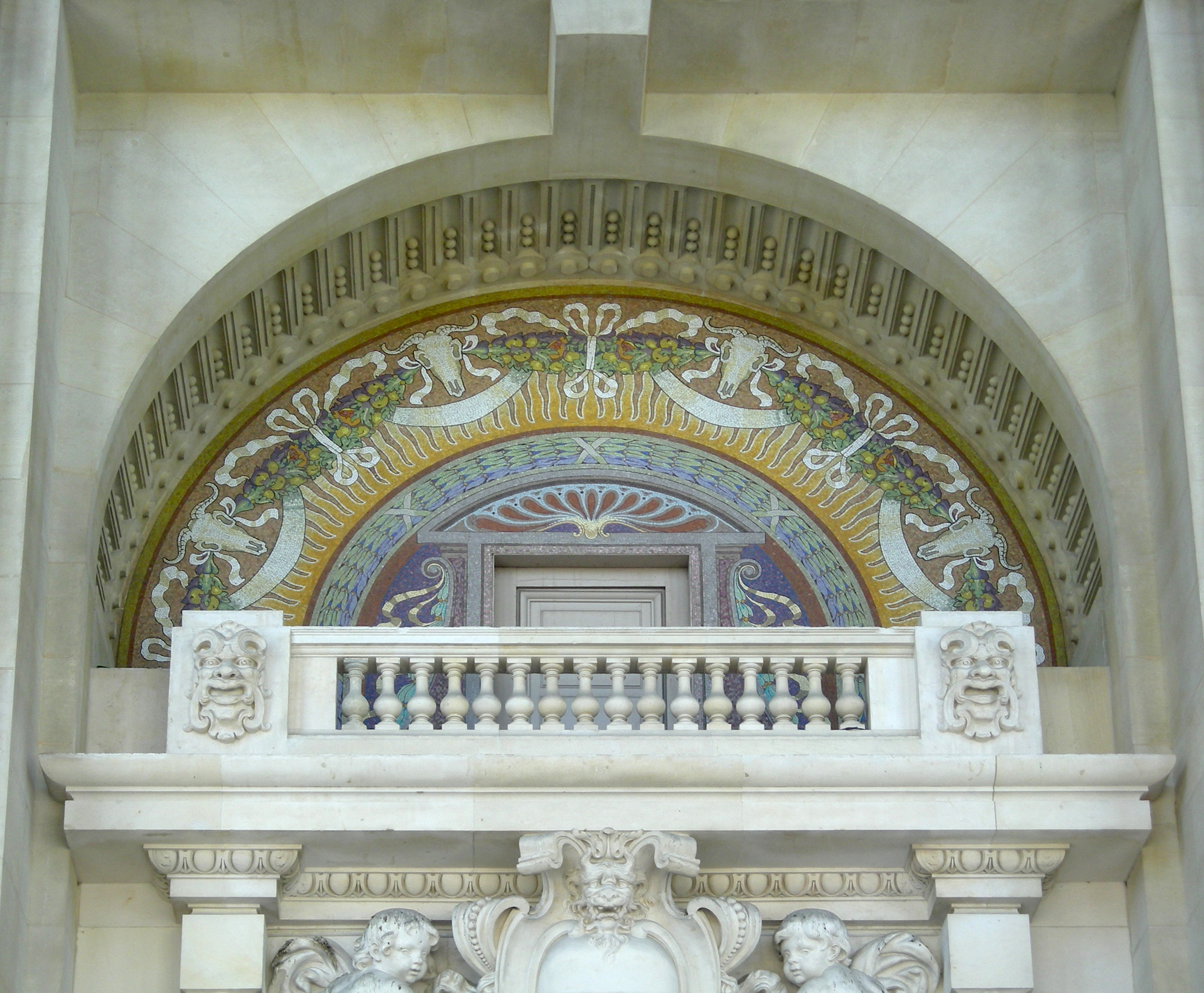
Beaux-Arts mosaic of bucrania and festoons on the Grand Palais, Paris, by Charles Girault, 1897–1900

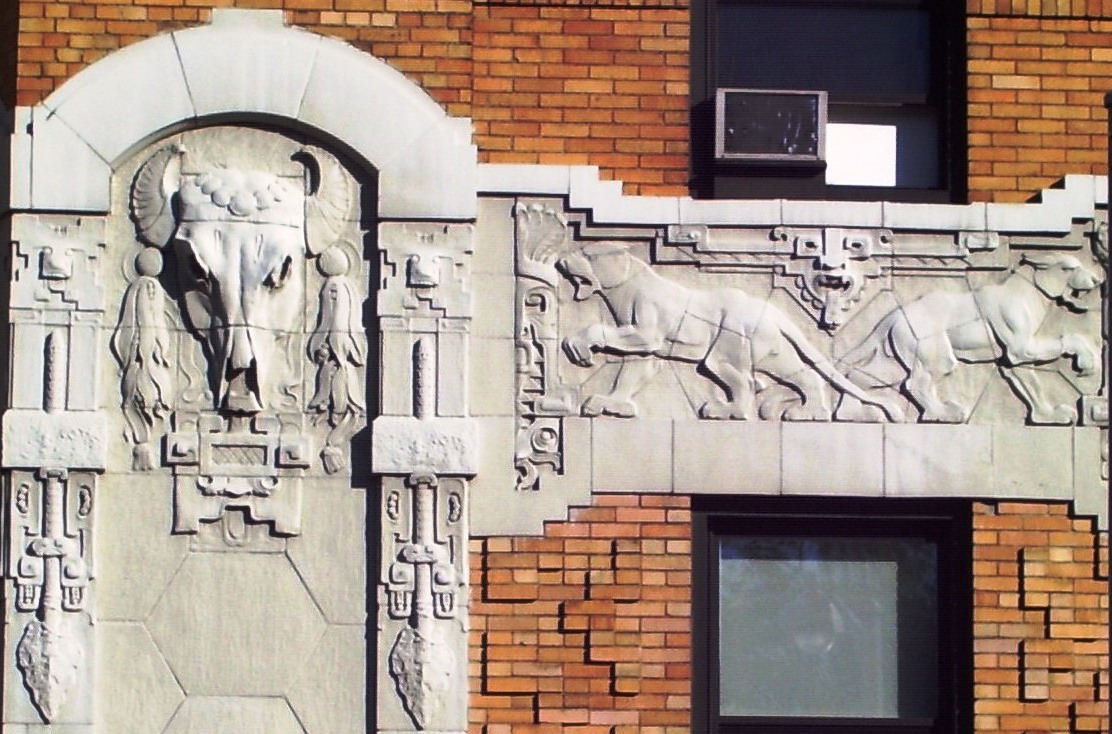
American interpretation inspired by Pre-Columbian art on the Cliff Dwelling (Riverside Drive no. 243), New York City, designed by Herman Lee Meader, 1914–1916

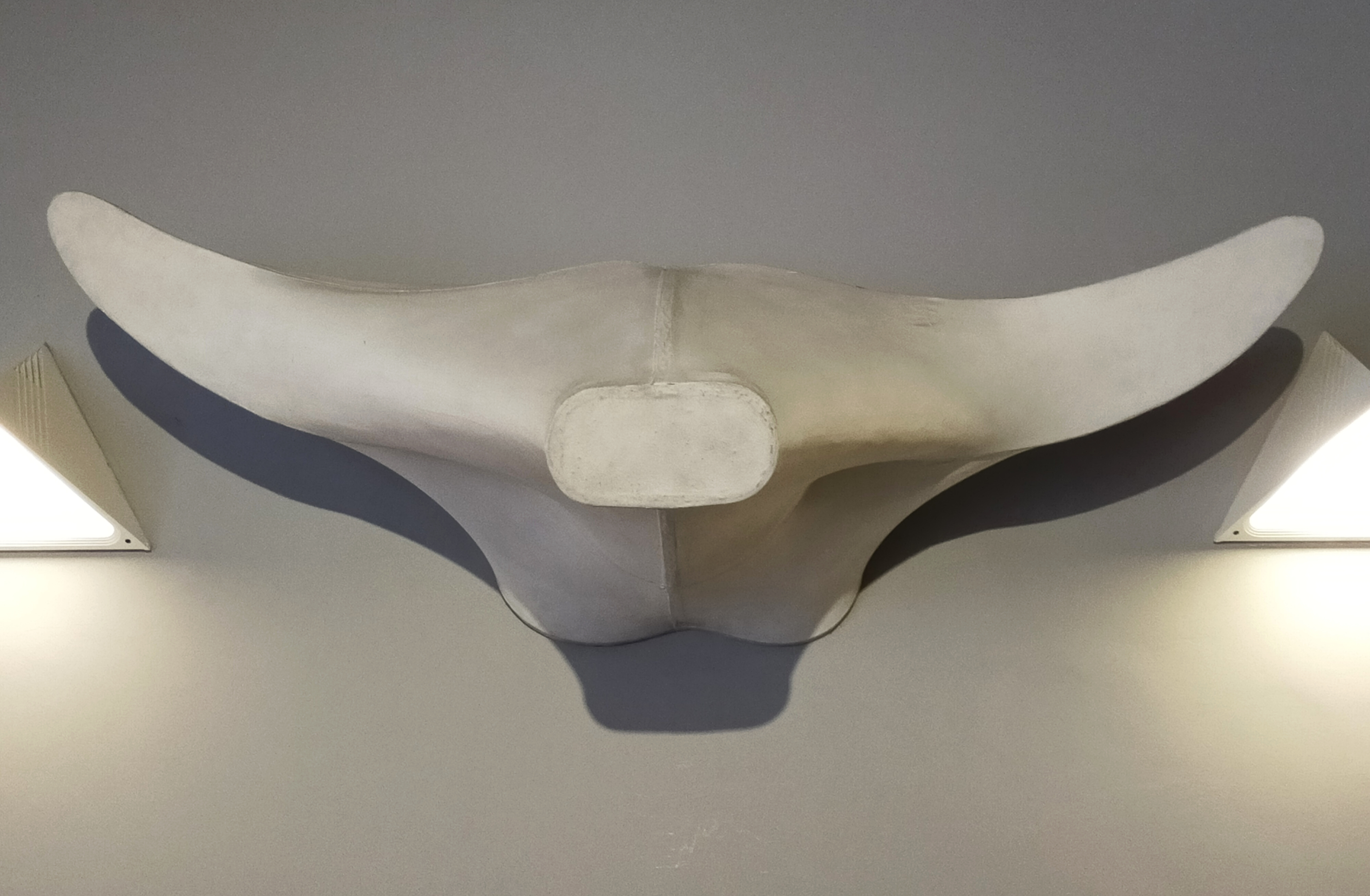
Bucranio, canvas sculpture by Pino Pascali (1938–1968), on display at the Museum of Modern Art in Avezzano, Italy

== See also ==
- Oscilla
- Plastered human skulls
