= Basilica of San Francesco =

Basilica of San Francesco may refer to:

- Basilica of San Francesco d'Assisi, another name for Basilica of Saint Francis of Assisi
- Basilica of San Francesco, Bologna
- Basilica of San Francesco, Arezzo
- Basilica of San Francesco, Siena
- Basilica di San Francesco alla Rocca, another name for San Francesco, Viterbo
- Basilica of San Francesco, Ravenna

== See also ==
- Basílica de San Francisco (disambiguation)
