= Basílica de San Francisco =

Basílica de San Francisco may refer to:

- Basilica of San Francisco el Grande, Madrid, Spain
- Basilica of San Francisco, La Paz, Bolivia
- Basílica Menor de San Francisco de Asís, Havana, Cuba

== See also ==
- Basilica of San Francesco (disambiguation)
