= Santa Maria in Porto Basilica =

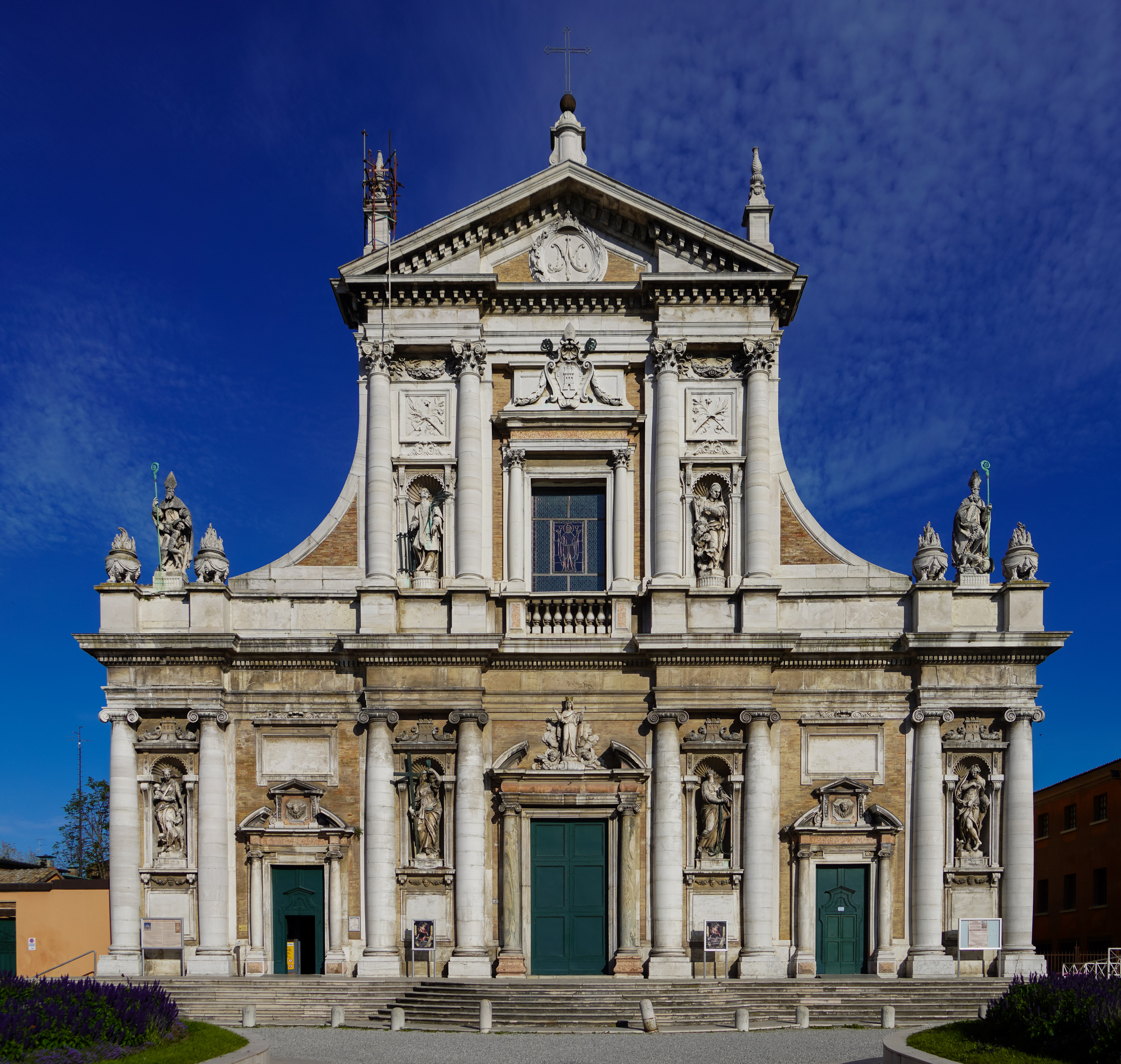
The church's 18th century facade.

The Basilica of Santa Maria in Porto was an important church in Ravenna, not far from Porta Nuova, on the via Roma, the north–south high street across the historic city centre. It houses the Greek Madonna.

== History ==
In the first half of the 15th century, the Canons Regular of Santa Maria in Porto decided to build a new monastery next to their church of Santa Maria in Porto Fuori, but the Republic of Venice forced them to build it instead inside the city walls. They acquired a site by the Porta Nuova, in the southern half of the walled city, and demolished the houses on the site on 5 August 1496.

The construction of the new monastery took thirty years and was only completed in 1509, though the canons moved in in 1503. They hosted pope Julius II in the new buildings in 1511 when he was travelling through Romagna - the same year he commissioned Bernardino Tavella to design the canons a new monastery church, but its construction only began in 1553. The roof of the central nave was completed in 1561, but the consecration of the whole church by only occurred on 8 October 1606 - it was presided over by Pietro Aldobrandini, camerlengo and archbishop of Ravenna.

In 1710 a new high altar was installed and the facade was finally completed in 1784 to designs by Camillo Morigia. When the French invaded in 1797, the sanctuary was ransacked and the monks expelled, with the new Pinacoteca di Brera in Milan assigned a painting from the monastery by Ercole de Roberti "known as the Pala Portuense ... [showing] the Virgin and Child enthroned; Saints Anne, Elisabeth and Augustine and Blessed Pietro degli Onesti". The monastery was closed in 1798 and turned into a barracks, but it was restored in 1828, only for the monastery to close down for good in 1886 due to the laws on church assets. It initially became a sweetshop before being turned over to the diocese as a parish church, taking the territory of the suppressed church of Santa Barbara in the city. Archbishop Vincenzo Moretti (1871-1879) and his successors promoted the restoration of the cult of the Greek Madonna in the church - on 21 April 1900, the 800th anniversary of its miraculous appearance, the sculpture was solemnly crowned.

A bomb hit the choir on 24 July 1944 but the church was restored after the war. It was then promoted to minor basilica status in 1960 by pope John XXIII. Part of the monastery buildings is occupied by monks of the Order of Saint Paul, the First Hermit, who also hold mass in the church, and part has housed the town's art gallery since 1972.

== Bibliography ==
- Wladimiro Bendazzi e Riccardo Ricci, Ravenna. Guida alla conoscenza della città. Mosaici arte storia archeologia monumenti musei, Ravenna, Edizioni Sirri, 1992. ISBN 88-86239-00-9.
- Gianfranco Bustacchini, Ravenna capitale del mosaico, Ravenna, Edizioni Salbaroli, 1988. ISBN 88-7193-324-9
- Luca Mozzati, Le grandi città d'arte italiane. Ravenna, Milano, Electa, 2007.
