= Greek Madonna (sculpture) =

Byzantine sculpture of the Virgin Mary in Ravenna

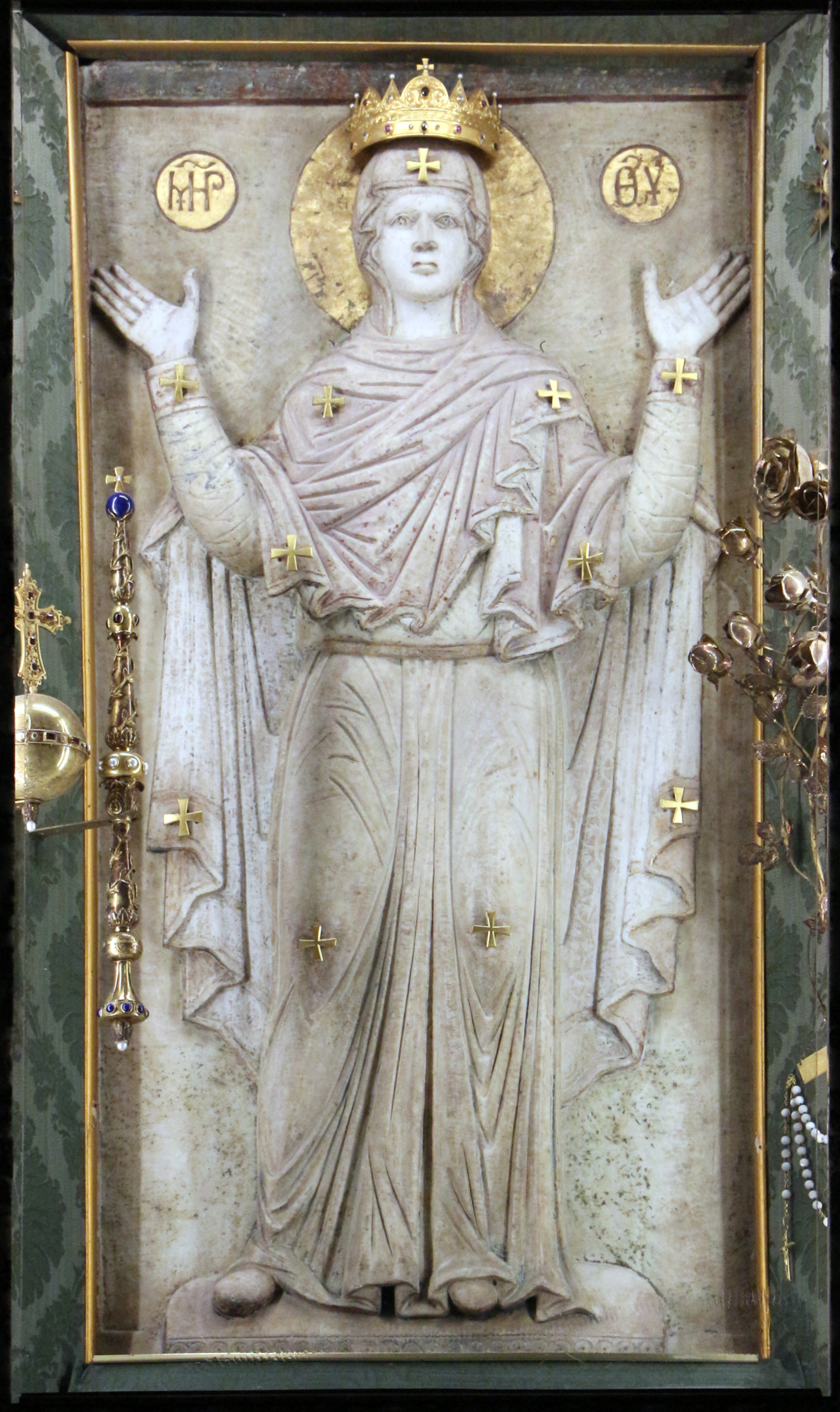
The Greek Madonna of Ravenna

The Greek Madonna (Madonna Greca in Italian) is a Byzantine marble bas-relief sculpture of the Virgin Mary in Ravenna - she is patron saint of the city, the Roman Catholic Archdiocese of Ravenna-Cervia and the Vicariate of the Sea (Vicariato del Mare). It is in the Santa Maria in Porto Basilica in the city.

Like many locally famous sculptures, it acquired a legendary origin story, but to art historians it is a Byzantine sculpture, perhaps of the 9th century, that arrived in Ravenna by unknown means by around 1100.

== History ==
Historically, the image was probably made in a workshop in or near Constantinople and then brought from there to Italy either to escape iconoclasm or by a soldier on the First Crusade in the late 11th century. Pietro degli Onesti had definitely built a church dedicated to Mary in the 12th century, Santa Maria in Porto Fuori, mentioned by Dante as a "house of Our Lady on the Lido Adriano" and destroyed in an air-raid on 6 November 1944. There he founded the "Sons and Daughters of Mary" to promote her cult on the anniversary of the image's legendary arrival and there he was buried. The relief remained in that church until 1503, when the monks moved to a new monastic church inside the city walls and installed the sculpture in the wall of a side chapel there.

Pope Julius II stayed with the monks in 1511 and promoted the construction of another new church specifically to house the sculpture. That church was completed in 1570 and that year the work was solemnly translated to a side-chapel in its interior, where it still remains. 'Domenica in albis' is still celebrated annually as the Festival of the Greek Madonna, with a procession from the canal to the church.

== Legend ==
According to a legend in the Carte Portuensi, Pietro degli Onesti and the monks of Santa Maria in Porto (the Porto Fuori gate was then by the shoreline) were starting to say matins on Domenica in albis, the first Sunday after Easter, on 8 April 1100. Suddenly the apse of their church began to shine with light and - as it was too early for it to be sunlight - the monks went out onto the seaside to find its source. This proved to be the torches of two angels, who were escorting an image of the Virgin Mary which was floating on the water. The monks knelt to greet the Virgin Mary with prayers and songs and then exhorted Pietro to pick up the image. He did not feel himself worthy to do so and asked his fellow monks to go fetch it, but the image kept receding from them when they approached. Pietro then approached it with his arms stretched wide in welcome, at which the angels vanished and the image moved towards him.
