= Camillo Morigia =

Italian architect (1743–1795)

Count Camillo Moriggia
- Count and Patrician of Ravenna
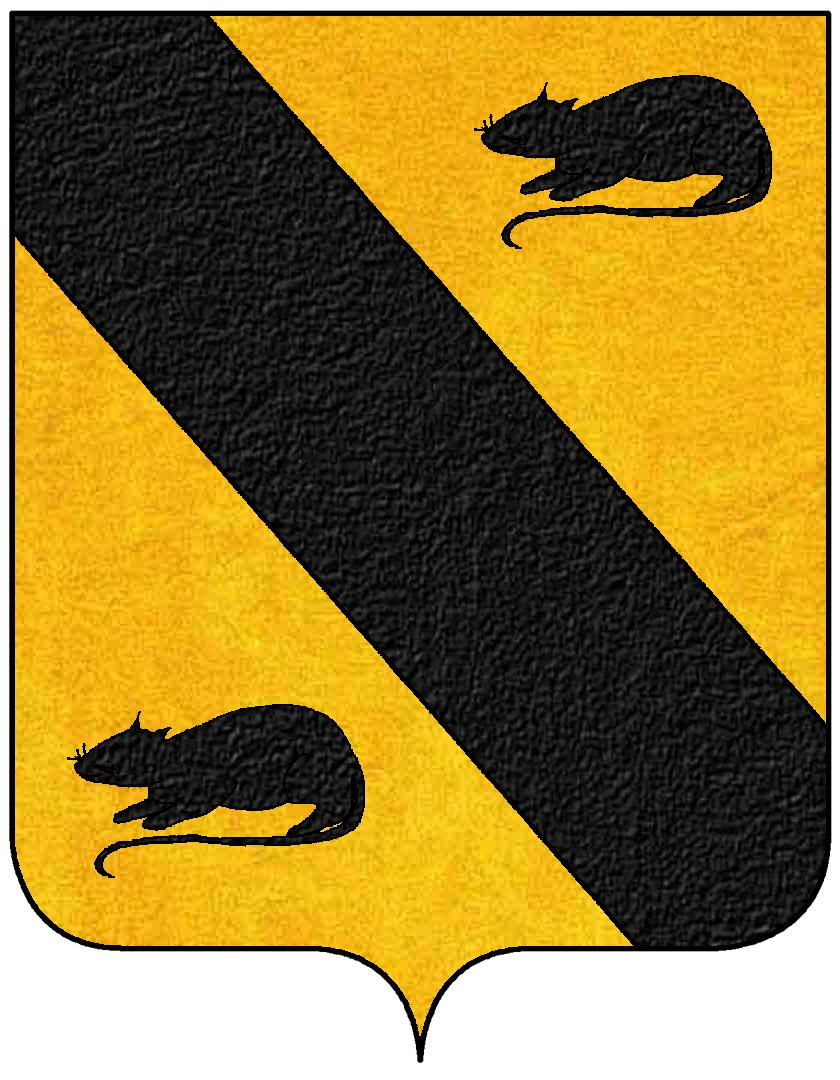
- Predecessor: Giovan Battista Moriggia
- Born: 15 September 1743; Ravenna
- Died: 16 January 1795 (aged 51); Ravenna
- Noble family: Moriggia
- Father: Count Giovan Battista Moriggia
- Mother: Countess Laura Monaldini

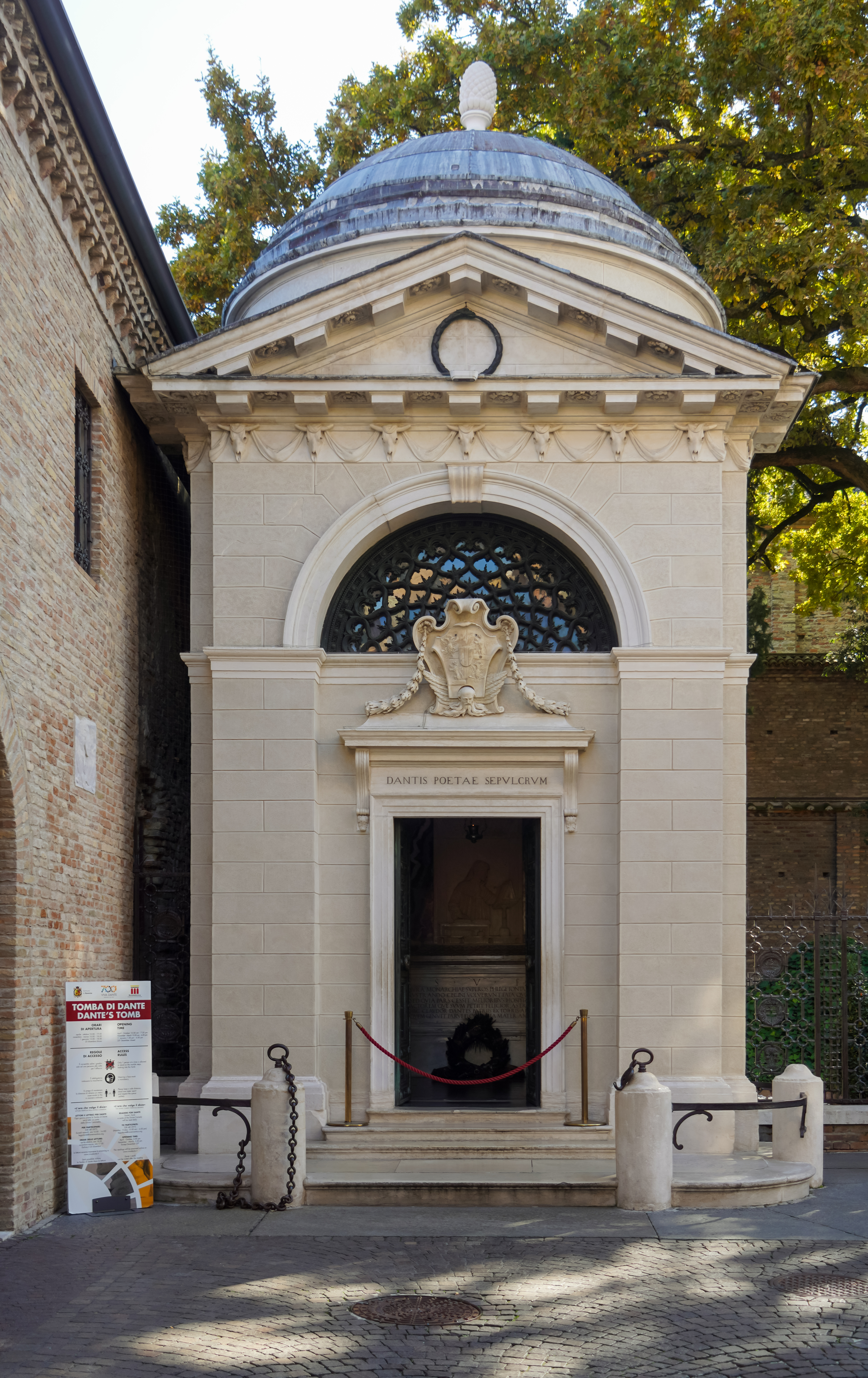
Dante Alighieri tomb in Ravenna

Camillo Morigia (15 September 1743, Ravenna - 16 January 1795, Ravenna) was a north-Italian neo-classical architect. He is most notable for his designs for the Tomb of Dante and the facade of Santa Maria in Porto Basilica, both in his home-town of Ravenna.

== Biography ==
He was born in Ravenna from the illustrious family of Moriggia. His father was an important member of the nobility of Ravenna and when he died Camillo inherited the title of count. He was the last member of the main branch of the rich family Moriggia.

== Bibliography ==
- (in Italian) Nullo Pirazzoli, Paolo Fabbri, Camillo Morigia (1743-1795). Architettura e riformismo nelle Legazioni, con un saggio di Marco Dezzi Bardeschi, Imola, University Press Bologna, 1976
- (in Italian) Nullo Pirazzoli, Ravenna nel Settecento in Storia di Ravenna, vol. IV (a cura di Lucio Gambi), Venezia, Marsilio Editori, 1994
