= Tomb of Dante =

Mausoleum in Ravenna, Italy

Coordinates: 44°24′58″N 12°12′03″E

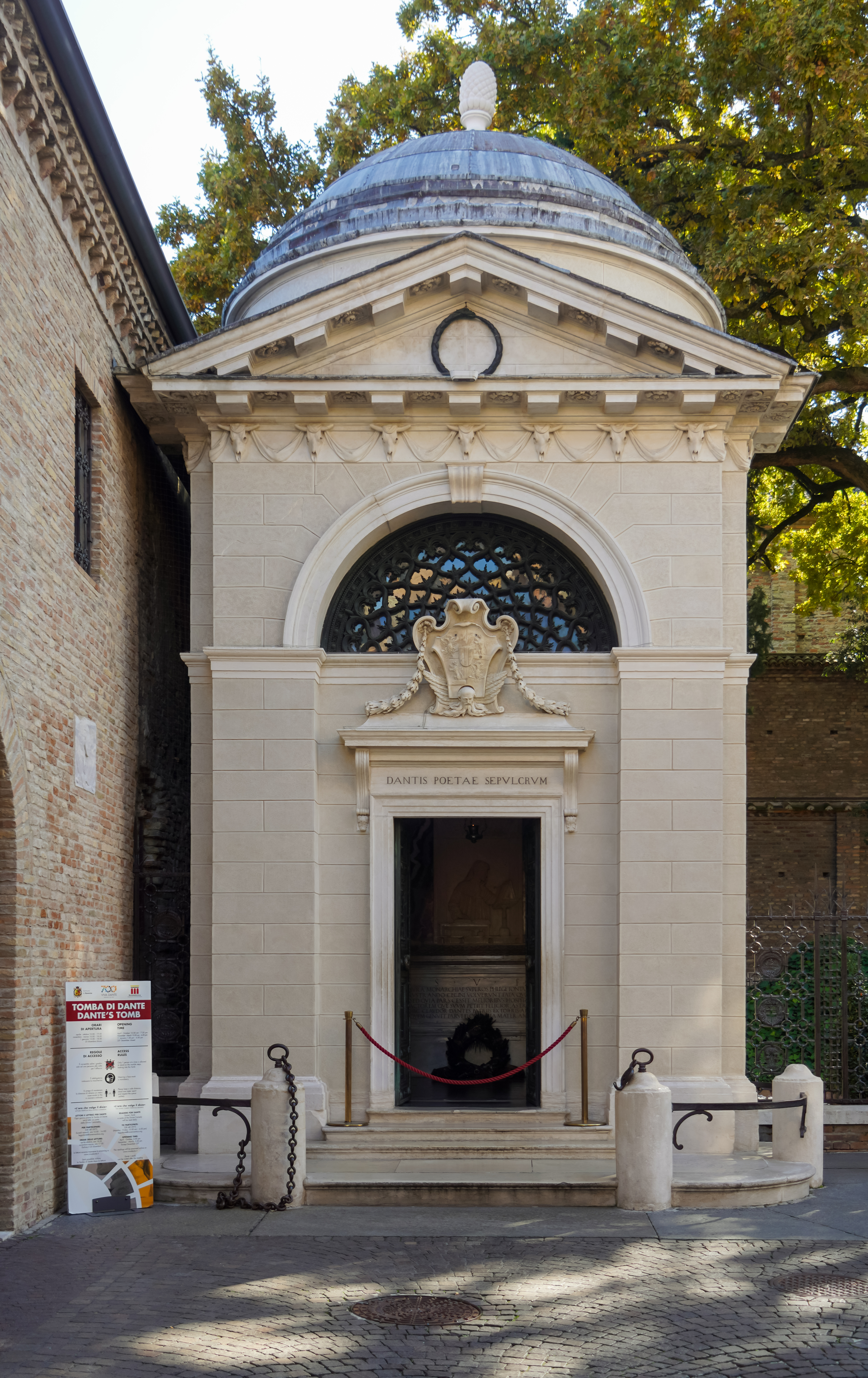
Exterior of the 18th-century monument.

The Tomb of Dante (Italian: Sepolcro di Dante) is an Italian neoclassical national monument built over the tomb of the poet Dante Alighieri (1265-1321) in 1781. It is sited next to the Basilica of San Francesco in central Ravenna.

The monument is surrounded by a "zona dantesca", in which visitors have to remain silent and respectful. The small garden to the monument's right originated as the monastic cloister but now only has a colonnade on one side. The garden is traditionally named after the Quadrarco di Braccioforte, where two people invoked the "strong arm" of Christ to guarantee their contract and therefore had the image of that arm painted on the arch.

== History ==
=== Burial ===
Dante spent his final years in exile in Ravenna and died there in 1321. The day after his death his funeral was held in the cloister of the basilica, then a Franciscan monastery, the Church of San Pier Maggiore, later called Basilica di San Francesco. He was then buried outside the cloister by the roadside in an ancient Roman sarcophagus, in which he still rests. Bernardo Canaccio wrote a poetic Latin epitaph in 1366, which was inscribed on its lid:

"Iura monarchiae superos Phlegetonta lacusque

lustrando cecini volverunt fata quousque
sed quia pars cessit melioribus hospita castris
actoremque suum petiit felicior astris
hic claudor Dantes patriis extorris ab oris

quem genuit parvi Florentia mater amoris"

The sarcophagus was moved to the west side of the cloister by Bernardo Bembo, Venetian podestà of Ravenna, at the end of the 15th century.

A few years later Dante's hometown of Florence began making requests to have his remains returned. This had the support of two Medici popes, Pope Leo X and Pope Clement VII. The first request was supported by Michelangelo and in 1519 Leo granted Florence permission to move the sarcophagus there, but the Franciscans had enough time to make a hole in the wall and secretly move Dante's bones there. A Tuscan delegation duly arrived but found the sarcophagus empty. It was moved into the cloister and kept under guard.

=== 17th to 19th centuries ===
Meanwhile the bones were put in a new box in 1677 by Antonio Santi, prior of the monastery. The sarcophagus was restored under armed guard in 1692. The bones were put back in their original sarcophagus in 1781, the same year as the monument was completed, having been commissioned from the local architect Camillo Morigia by Luigi Valenti Gonzaga, the cardinal legate in Romagna. Square in plan and with a small cupola and dome, it covers the sarcophagus. Its interior is covered in marble and stucco. Morigia planned to have images of Virgil, Brunetto Latini, Cangrande della Scala and Guido Novello da Polenta in the pendentives of the dome's interior vault, but this plan was abandoned.

Behind the sarcophagus is a 1483 bas-relief by Pietro Lombardo, which also stood in this position for most of the 15th century, showing Dante reading at a lectern. From the ceiling hangs an 18th-century votive lamp, continually kept burning with olive oil from the Tuscan hills donated by Florence every 14 September, the anniversary of Dante's death. The monument's facade to the street is very simple, with a gate surmounted by Cardinal Gonzaga's archiepiscopal coat of arms and the simple inscription "DANTIS POETAE SEPULCRUM" ("tomb of Dante the poet"). The friars hid the bones in the 1677 box again in 1810 during the French occupation to prevent them being confiscated. They hid the box under an old doorway between the Basilica of San Francesco and the Braccioforte Chapel before leaving the city. Florence had not given up hope of having the remains removed from Ravenna, however, and in 1829 the city erected a cenotaph in Santa Croce Basilica, showing the poet seated in thought and a personification of Poetry weeping over the sarcophagus.

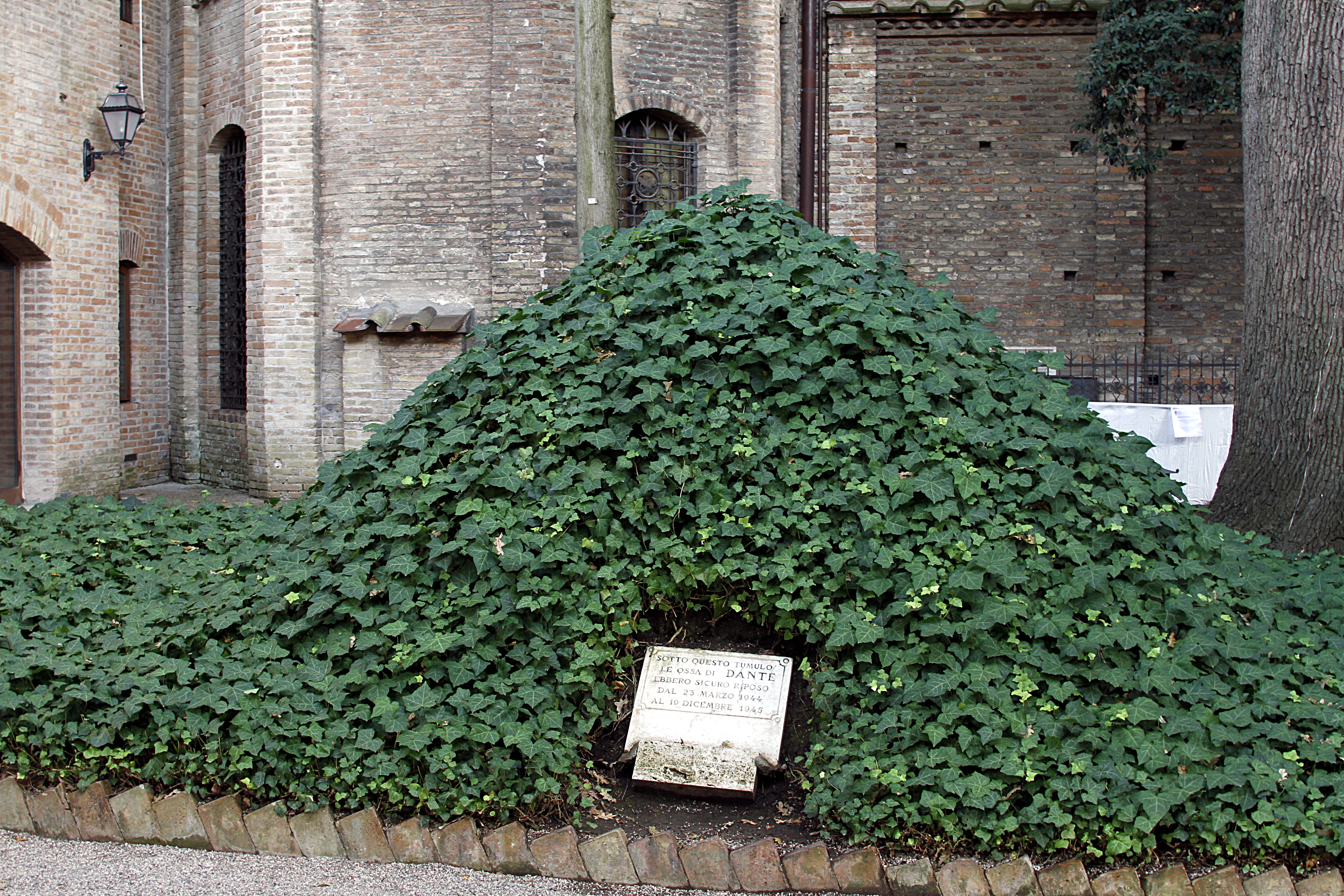
The mound which held the bones from 1944 to 1945.

The box's location was forgotten until 27 May 1865, when it was found by a worker carrying out restoration work for the 600th anniversary of Dante's birth. A young student and later a respected notary, Matteucci Anastasio, noticed the words "OSSA DANTIS" (Dante's bones) on the box and saved it from being thrown into a common grave. (The full inscription stated: "Dantis ossa a me Frate Antonio Santi hic posita 1677, die 18 Octobris", written by Friar Santi.)

The almost complete skeleton of bones were rearticulated and put on display to the public in a crystal coffin for a few months before being reburied under the monument in a walnut chest protected by a lead cover. It remains in place and has never been returned to Florence.

=== 1900–present ===
In 1921 a bronze garland was added to the foot of the sarcophagus in memory of the dead of World War I, as well as a marble plaque to its right describing the various restorations of the tomb and an iron gate to the neighbouring garden, designed by the Venetian artist Umberto Bellotto. The bones were hidden yet again during World War II to prevent them being destroyed by bombing. They were buried in the garden from March 1944 to 19 December 1945 until they were returned to the monument, now marked with a plaque. The monument was restored in 2006–2007, including a complete repainting of its facades.
