= Basilica of San Francesco, Ravenna =

Church in Ravenna, Italy

Coordinates: 44°24′57″N 12°12′04″E

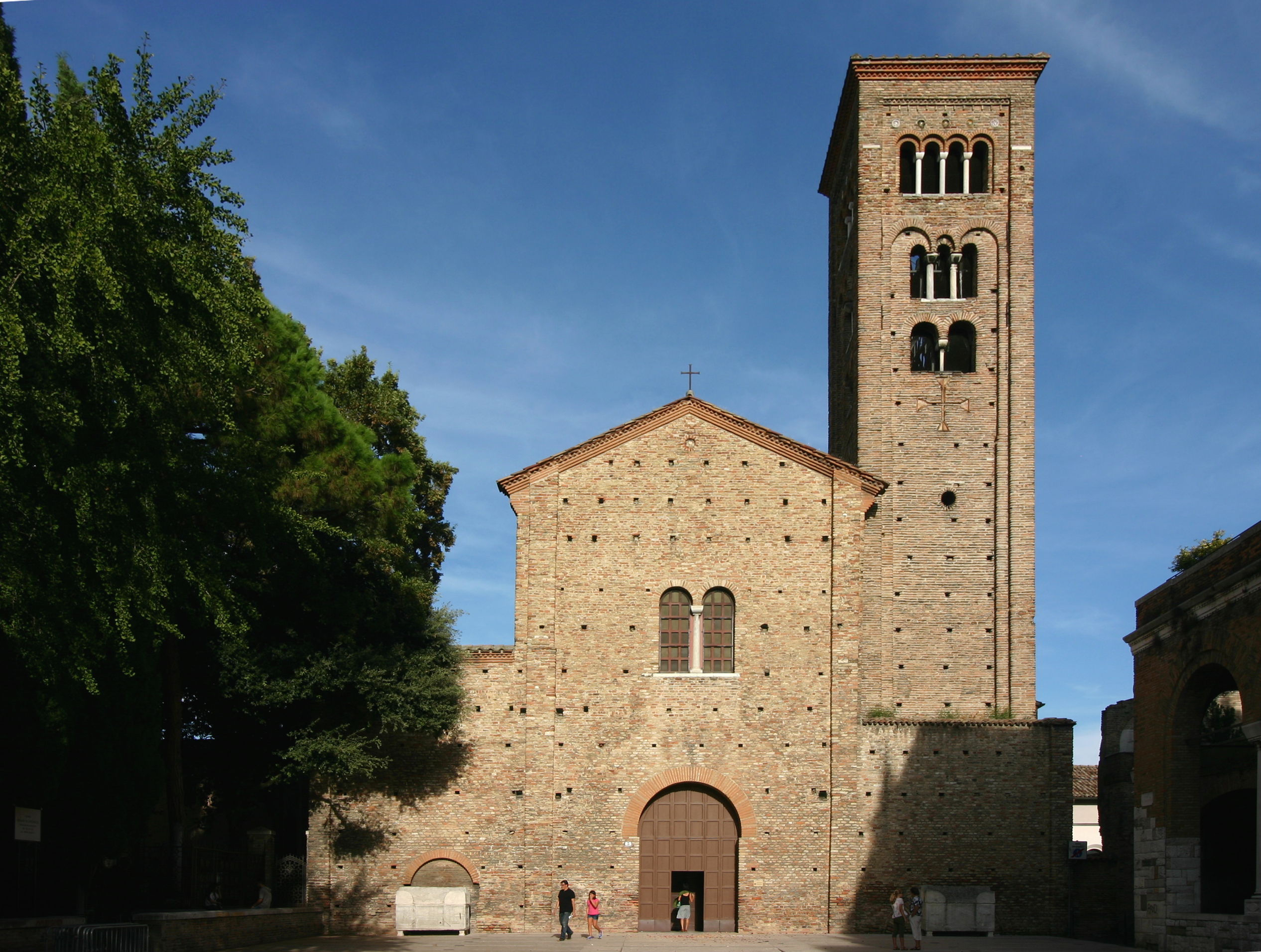
Facade of the church.

The Basilica of San Francesco is a major church in Ravenna. It was first built in 450 by Neo, bishop of Ravenna, and dedicated to saint Peter and Saint Paul. It was later also known as the Church of the Apostles (Chiesa degli Apostoli). In the second half of the 9th century and over the course of the 10th century, the earlier church was demolished to build a larger one and a tall bell tower, both of which survive. This new church was dedicated to Saint Peter and named San Pietro Maggiore. It was handed over to the Franciscans in 1261 and rededicated to Francis of Assisi.

Dante Alighieri's funeral was held in the church in 1321 and his remains still rest next to the church in the Tomb of Dante. Between 1500 and 1700 the church was restored again and again and Baroque altars and decorations were added. The most important restoration was that under Pietro Zumaglini in 1793. Ravenna was occupied by the French soon afterwards and in 1810 the monastery was suppressed, with its buildings confiscated by the authorities but the church kept open as a parish church, which it still is. Between 1918 and 1921, in preparation for the 600th anniversary of Dante's death, the church was radically restored, removing all the Baroque additions and returning it to something like its original style. A competition was held during the anniversary for a new scheme inside the church based on Dante's best known work, the Divine Comedy. Adolfo De Carolis won the competition but his sudden death prevented his scheme from being realised. The crypt was restored between 1926 and 1970 and in 1949 the Franciscans took on the church once again. Instead of the old monastery buildings, they moved into a building opposite the church and continued to run it as a parish church.
