= Chiaro Davanzati =

Italian poet

Chiaro Davanzati (died 1304) was an Italian poet from Florence, one of the Siculo-Tuscan poets, who introduced the style of Sicilian School to the Tuscan School. He was one of the most prolific Italian authors before Dante: at least 122 sonnets and sixty-one canzoni by Chiaro are known, many of them in tenzone with other poets. Only Guittone d'Arezzo produced more lyrics in the thirteenth century.

== Life ==
The Davanzati were an elite family in Florence. Chiaro participated in the Battle of Montaperti in 1260. There is some disagreement as to which of two known Chiaro Davanzatis of Florence might be the poet. One, Chiarus f. Davanzati pp. scte Marie Sopr'Arno, of Santa Maria sopr'Arno, was dead by 1280. Another, Clarus F. Davanzati Banbakai, was a Guelph of San Frediano. He served as captain of Or San Michele in 1294 and died between August 1303 and the spring of 1304. Both Chiaros were married and had children. The poet could not have been dead by 1280, for he composed a tenzone that can be dated to 1283.

== Works ==
Most of Chiaro's work is preserved in the chansonnier Vaticano latino 3793. Topically his poetry is in the Sicilian and Occitan traditions. The chief poets whose influence can be detected are the troubadour Rigaut de Berbezilh and of the Sicilians Giacomo da Lentini, Guido delle Colonne, and Stefano Protonotaro. His style is light and easy (trobar leu), and rich in simile. His use of simile, much of it drawn from the Occitan troubadours and medieval bestiaries, has been criticised as dry, unpoetic, and overused. In the fourteenth century his reputation declined considerably, as his method of elaborating old lyrics fell out of favour. One of his images, however, that of a child at a mirror (come 'l fantin ca ne lo speglio smira), was used even in the Renaissance. Kenneth McKenzie describes Chiaro's "style" as developing over time and containing widely divergent elements under opposing influences:

. . . at one period of his activity Chiaro decked his verse in plumes borrowed from the Provençal and Sicilian poets and from Guittone d'Arezzo; but there is great variety in his work; we find political poems, realistic poems in popular style, attempts at philosophy, and finally indications of the influence of Guinizelli and the dolce stil novo.

Though Chiaro has been placed with the guittoniani, followers of Guittone d'Arezzo, before, only in the canzone Valer voria s'io mai fui validore does Chiaro address Guittone directly. When deviating from the trobar leu into more difficult and complex construction he is usually conversing with guittoniani, such as Pallamidesse Bellindoti or Rinuccino, with Monte Andrea, his most common correspondent, or with Finfo del Buono. Chiaro had a correspondence with "Dante" according to the manuscripts, but this is regarded now as probably Dante da Maiano, in 1283.

In Di penne di paone ("Of the peacock's feathers") Chiaro accused Bonagiunta Orbicciani of plagiarising Giacomo da Lentini. In 1267 Chario composed Ahi dolze e gaia terra fiorentina to reprimand his fellow Florentines on the occasion of their surrendering of power to Charles I of Sicily, whom they made podestà while the Ghibellines were sent into exile.
