= Dante da Maiano =

13th-century Italian poet

Dante da Maiano was a late thirteenth-century poet who composed mainly sonnets in Italian and Occitan. He was an older contemporary of Dante Alighieri and active in Florence.

He may have been a Provençal- or Auvergnat-speaker from Maillane (the birthplace of Frédéric Mistral), but more probably he was from the Tuscan village of Maiano near Fiesole. In 1882 Adolfo Borgognoni argued that he was an invention of Renaissance philology, but met with the opposition of F. Novati in 1883 and Giovanni Bertacchi in 1896. Bertacchi argued that Dante da Maiano was the same person as the Dante Magalante, son of ser Ugo da Maiano, who appears in a public record of 1301. At the time this Dante was living in the monastery of San Benedetto in Alpe and was requested in mundualdum by a relative of his, Lapa, widow of Vanni di Chello Davizzi, to be her tutor. That a Dante da Maiano existed during the lifetime of Dante Alighieri and that he was capable of "tutoring" was thus established, but the identification with the poet could not be made certain. Santorre Debenedetti finally disproved Borgognoni's thesis in 1907. He discovered two Occitan sonnets ascribed to Dante da Maiano in a fifteenth-century Italian manuscript conserved in the Biblioteca Laurentiana, Florence.

Almost all Dante's extant work is preserved in the Giuntina (or "Junte"), a Florentine chansonnier compiled in 1527 under the title Sonetti e canzoni di diversi avtori toscani in dieci libri raccolte by Filippo Giunti. His total work is some forty-eight sonnets, five ballate, two canzoni, and a series of tenzoni with Dante Alighieri. He was influenced by the troubadours (notably Bernart de Ventadorn), the Sicilian School and in particular Giacomo da Lentini, the Tuscan School of Guittone d'Arezzo, and the later dolce stil novo, though he belongs to none of these. Rosanna Betarrini calls his work a "pastiche" and Antonio Enzo Quaglio a silloge archeologica della produzione anteriore e contemporanea ("an archaeological collection of past and contemporary production").

Dante da Maiano wrote a sonnet in response to A ciascun' alma presa e gentil core, the first sonnet in Dante Alighieri's Vita nuova. There was also a five-part exchange (probably preceding the Vita nuova) called the duol d'amore ("dolour of love"), in which Dante da Maiano wrote three pieces and Dante Alighieri responded to the first two. In a final two-part communication, Dante Alighieri wrote Savere e cortesia, ingegno ed arte to Dante da Maiano's Amor mi fa sì fedelmente amare. In all their correspondence, the elder Dante assumes an air of superiority towards his up-and-coming interlocutor, the future author of the Divine Comedy. Before Dante Alighieri's career had taken off, the elder Dante was for a time quite famous in Florence for his sonnet Provedi, saggio, ad esta visïone, in which he recounts a dream he had and asks his fellow citizens for an interpretation. Chiaro Davanzati, Guido Orlandi, Salvino Doni, Ricco da Varlungo, Cino da Pistoja and Dante Alighieri, in what was to be his earliest still-extant poem, all responded. Dante da Maiano, along with Cino da Pistoja, also wrote a response to a sonnet (Guido, vorrei che tu e Lapo ed io) that Alighieri sent to his friend Guido Cavalcanti.

According to later stories now generally considered only legend, Dante also kept up a correspondence with Nina of Sicily, the first Italian woman poet, and with whom he fell in love. Their relationship became well-known and she grew in fame because of his writings so she was called la Nina di Dante. She took up poetry, apparently, as a result of his influence.

Víctor Balaguer published the Occitan sonnet Las! so qe m'es el cor plus fis e qars in 1879, where he also hypothesised for Dante a birthplace in Provence. Despite these Occitan sonnets and Dante's more probable birthplace in Tuscany, Giulio Bertoni disqualified Dante from being an "Italian troubadour" in his 1915 study. By one reckoning, Dante's Occitan sonnets are the earliest examples of what is undisputedly an Italian form, but the invention of which is usually assigned to Giacomo da Lentini.

== Complete list of works ==
- Convemmi dimostrar lo meo savere
- Aggio talento, s'eo savesse, dire
- Di voi mi stringe tanto lo disire
- Ahi gentil donna gaia ed amorosa
- O fresca rosa, a voi chero mercede
- O rosa e giglio e flore aloroso
- Viso mirabil, gola morganata
- Ver' te mi doglio, perch'ài lo savere
- Angelica figura umìle e piana
- Lasso, per ben servir son adastiato
- Cera amorosa di nobilitate
- Sed io avesse tanto d'ardimento
- O lasso me, che son preso ad inganno
- La flor—d'amor,—veggendola parlare
- Ben veggio, Amore, che la tua possanza
- Rimembrivi oramai del greve ardore
- Primer ch'eo vidi, gentil crïatura
- Convemmi dir, madonna, e dimostrare
- Se l'avvenente che m'ave in balia
- Lo meo gravoso affanno e lo dolore
- Uno amoroso e fin considerare
- Considerando, una amorosa voglia
- Amor m'aucide, né da lui difesa
- Perché m'avvèn, non m'oso lamentare
- Ver' la mia donna son sì temoroso
- Ohi lasso, che tuttor disio ed amo
- Da doglia e da rancura lo meo core
- Uno voler mi tragge 'l cor sovente
- Ahi meve lasso, che in cantar m'avvene
- O lasso, che mi val cotanto amare
- Ah meve lasso, la consideranza
- Sì m'abbellio la vostra gran plagenza
- Già non porà la vostra dolce cera
- Non perch'eo v'aggia, donna, fatto offesa
- Null'omo pò saver che sia doglienza
- Mante fïate pò l'om divisare
- Lasso, el pensero e lo voler non stagna
- Com' più diletto di voi, donna, prendo
- Usato avea per lungo temporale
- Gaia donna piacente e dilettosa
- Tanto amorosamente mi distringe
- Per Deo, dolze meo sir, non dimostrate
- Donna, la disdegnanza
- Per lungia sofferenza
- La dilettosa cera
- Lasso, merzé cherere
- Di ciò che stato sei dimandatore
- Per pruova di saper com' vale o quanto
- Lo vostro fermo dir fino ed orrato
- Lasso, lo dol che più mi dole e serra
- Amor mi fa sì fedelmente amare
- Le lode e 'l pregio e 'l senno e la valenza
- Di ciò ch'audivi dir primieramente
- Provedi, saggio, ad esta visïone
- Tutto ch'eo poco vaglia
- Visto aggio scritto et odito contare
- Tre pensier' aggio, onde mi vien pensare
- Già non m'agenza, Chiaro, il dimandare
- Saper voria da voi, nobile e saggio
- La gran virtù d'amore e 'l bel piacere
- Qual sete voi, sì cara proferenza
