= Duecento =

Italian culture and art of 1200–1299

Duecento (UK: /ˌdjuːəˈtʃɛntoʊ/ DEW-ə-CHEN-toh; Italian: [ˌdu.eˈtʃɛnto]; lit. 'two hundred', short for '1200'), or Dugento, is the Italian word for the Italian culture of the 13th century—that is to say 1200 to 1299. It was during this period that the first shoots of the Italian Renaissance appeared in art and literature, to be further developed in the following trecento period.

This period grew out of the Renaissance of the 12th century and movements originating elsewhere, such as the Gothic architecture of France. Most of the innovation in both the visual arts and literature was concentrated in the second half of the century, after about 1250, when major new directions opened up in both painting and sculpture, mostly in northern Italy, and the Dolce Stil Novo (Sweet New Style) emerged in poetry.

== Characteristics ==
In the 13th century, much of Europe experienced strong economic growth. The trade routes of the Italian states linked with those of established Mediterranean ports and eventually the Hanseatic League of the Baltic and northern regions of Europe to create a network economy in Europe for the first time since the 4th century. The city-states of Italy expanded greatly during this period and grew in power.

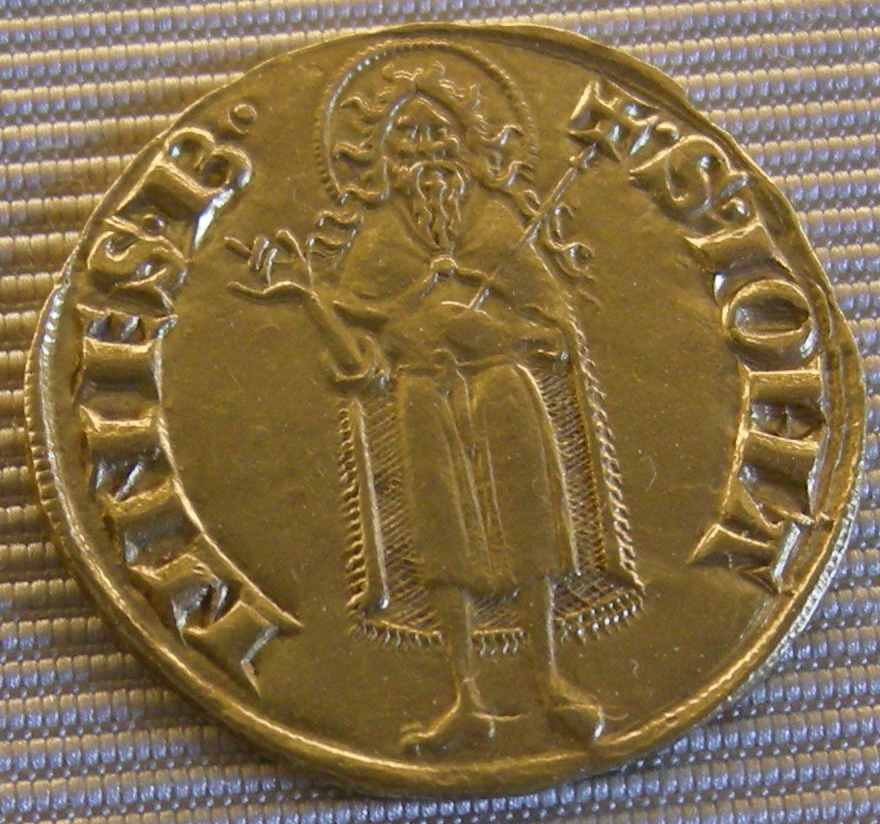
The gold florin of Florence started to be the main currency of European trade during the Duecento

During this period, the modern commercial infrastructure developed, with the creation in Italy of the double-entry book-keeping, joint stock companies, an international banking system, a systematized foreign exchange market, insurance, and government debt. Florence became the centre of this financial industry and the gold florin became the main currency of international trade. The Republic of Venice and the Republic of Genova dominated the trade in the Mediterranean sea.

Many argue that the ideas that characterized the Renaissance had their origin in late 13th century Florence, in particular with the writings of Dante Alighieri (1265–1321) as well as the painting of Giotto (1267–1337).

The Duecento was followed by the beginning of the Italian Renaissance during the Trecento.

== Literature ==
The thirteenth-century Italian literary revolution helped set the stage for the Renaissance. During this century, the standard modern Italian language began to be fixed, mainly as a literary language. Previously each region used its own language, as many continue to do, at least in the common spoken language. The standard modern Italian language began in poetic and literary writings of Tuscan and Sicilian writers of the 12th century, and the grammar and core lexicon are basically unchanged from those used in Florence in the 13th century.

It was only in the 13th century that Italian authors began writing in their native language rather than Latin, French, or Provençal. The 1250s saw a major change in Italian poetry as the Dolce Stil Novo (Sweet New Style, which emphasized Platonic rather than courtly love) came into its own, pioneered by poets like Guittone d'Arezzo and Guido Guinizelli. Especially in poetry, major changes in Italian literature had been taking place decades before the Renaissance truly began. An increasing number of works began to be written in the Italian language in addition to the flood of Latin and Greek texts that constituted the mainstream of the Italian Renaissance.

Written works expanded beyond works of theology and towards the pre-Christian eras of Imperial Rome and Ancient Greece. This is not to say that no religious works were written in this period. In the early years of the next century Dante Alighieri's The Divine Comedy reflects a distinctly medieval world view, and did much to establish the Tuscan language, in which it is written (also in most present-day Italian-market editions), as the standardized Italian language.

Christianity remained a major influence for artists and authors, with the classics coming into their own as a second primary influence.

Literature in Latin continued to be written, with Saint Thomas Aquinas's Summa Theologica a massive and unfinished summary and exploration of the theology of the medieval church, which has continued to be influential.

== Painting ==
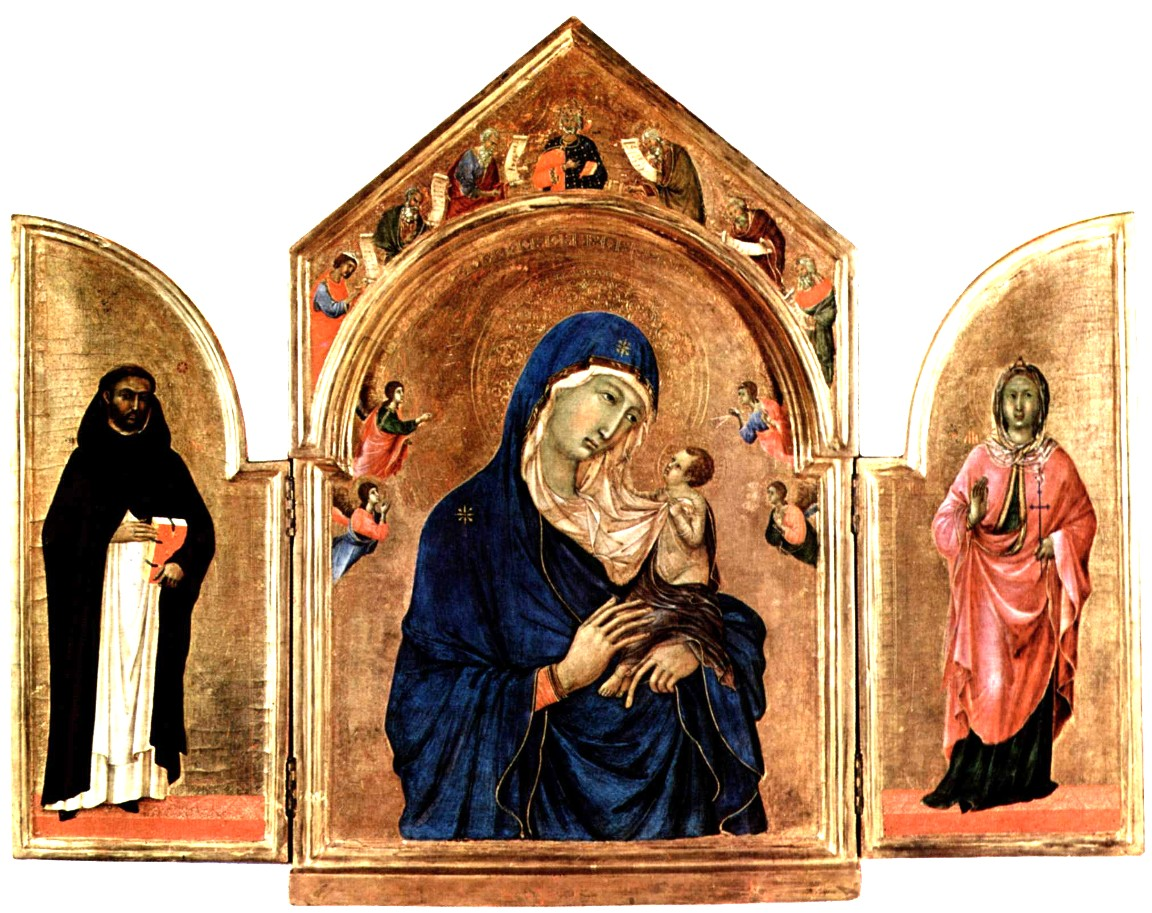
Madonna and Child by Duccio di Buoninsegna, c. 1280

Italo-Byzantine (or maniera greca) painting is a term for panel paintings produced in Italy, and Western Europe generally, under heavy influence from the icons of Byzantine art, whose many variations of the subject of the Madonna and Child were copied, though the full Byzantine technique and style was not. This remained the predominant style in Italy until new developments came in Tuscany and Rome later in the century, and remained common in many areas well into the next century and beyond.

The art of the region of Tuscany (and northern Italy) in the second half of the 13th century was dominated by two masters: Cimabue of Florence and Duccio of Siena. Their commissions were mostly religious paintings, several of them being very large altarpieces showing the Madonna and Child. These two painters, with their contemporaries, Guido of Siena, Coppo di Marcovaldo and the mysterious painter upon whose style the school may have originated, the so-called Master of St Bernardino, all worked in a manner that was highly formalised and dependent upon the ancient tradition of icon painting. Cimabue and Duccio both took steps in the direction of greater naturalism, as did their contemporary, Pietro Cavallini of Rome.

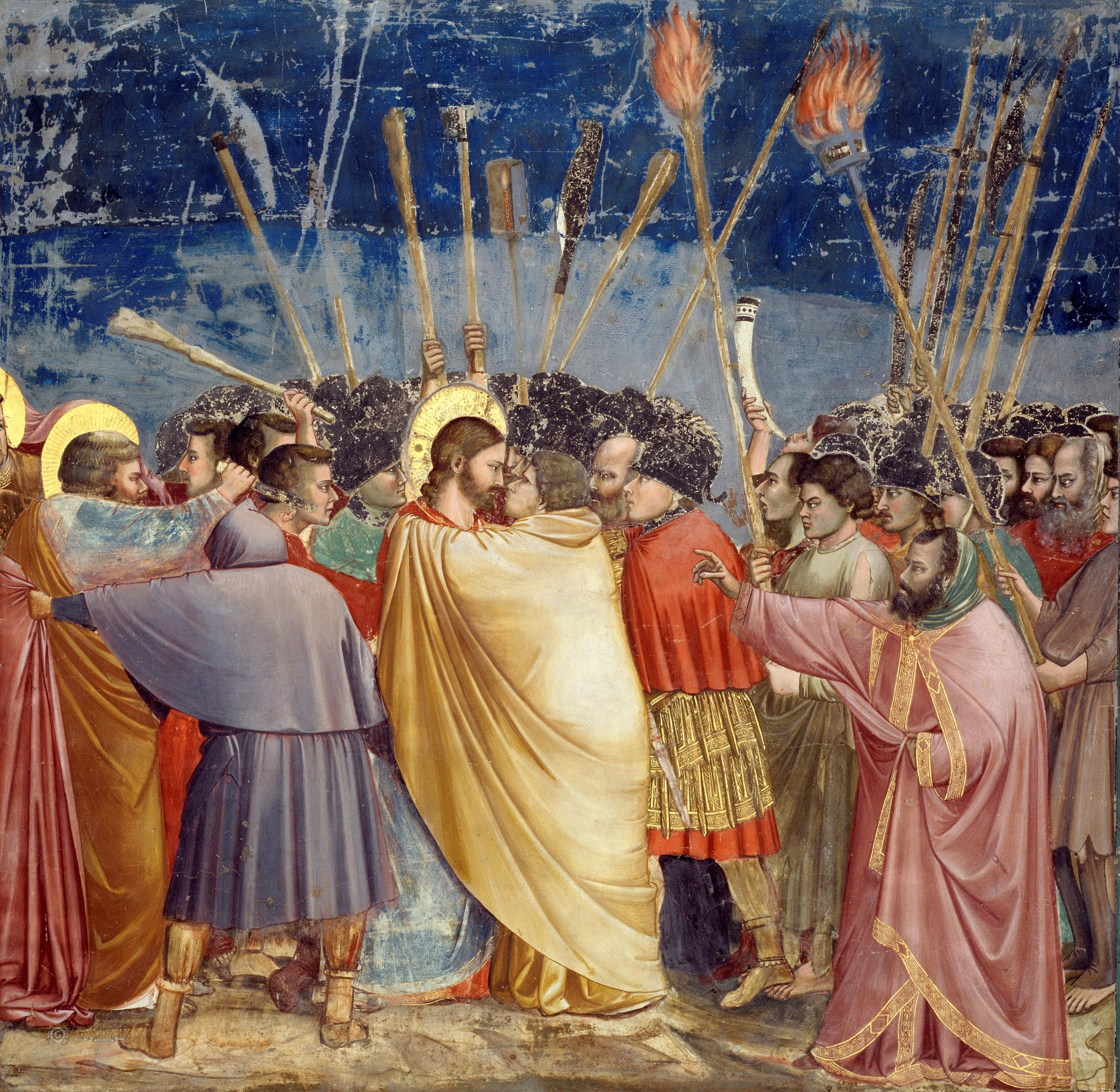
Giotto, Kiss of Judas, Scrovegni Chapel, c. 1305

Giotto (born in 1266) by tradition a shepherd boy from the hills north of Florence, became Cimabue's apprentice and emerged as the most outstanding painter of his time, though his most famous works came early in the following century. Giotto, possibly influenced by Pietro Cavallini and other Roman painters, did not base the figures that he painted upon any painterly tradition, but upon the observation of life. Unlike those of his Byzantine-related contemporaries, Giotto's figures are solidly three-dimensional; they stand squarely on the ground, have discernible anatomy and are clothed in garments with weight and structure. But more than anything, what set Giotto's figures apart from those of his contemporaries are their emotions. In the faces of Giotto's figures are joy, rage, despair, shame, spite and love. The cycle of frescoes of the Life of Christ and the Life of the Virgin that he painted in the Scrovegni Chapel in Padua set a new standard for narrative pictures. His Ognissanti Madonna hangs in the Uffizi Gallery, Florence, in the same room as Cimabue's Santa Trinita Madonna and Duccio's Ruccellai Madonna where the stylistic comparisons between the three can easily be made. One of the features apparent in Giotto's work is his observation of naturalistic perspective. He is regarded as the herald of the Renaissance.

== Sculpture ==
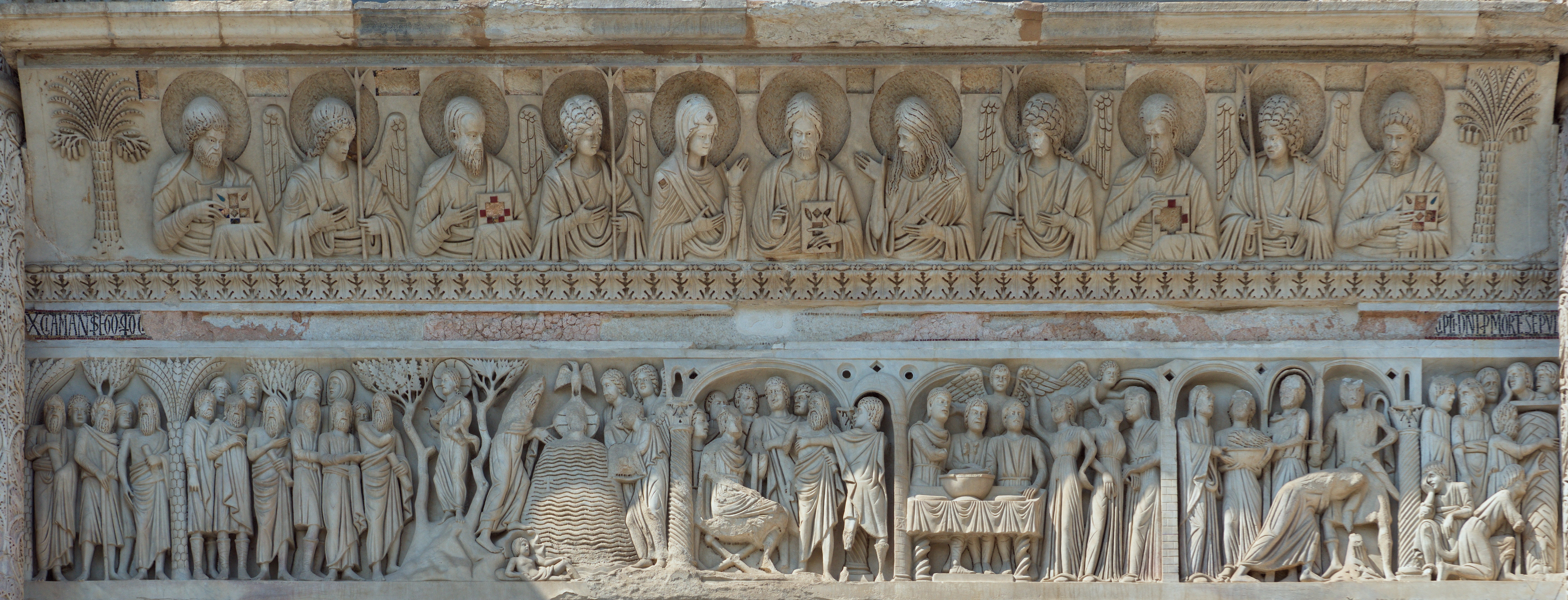
Architrave of door to the Pisa Baptistery, c. 1200

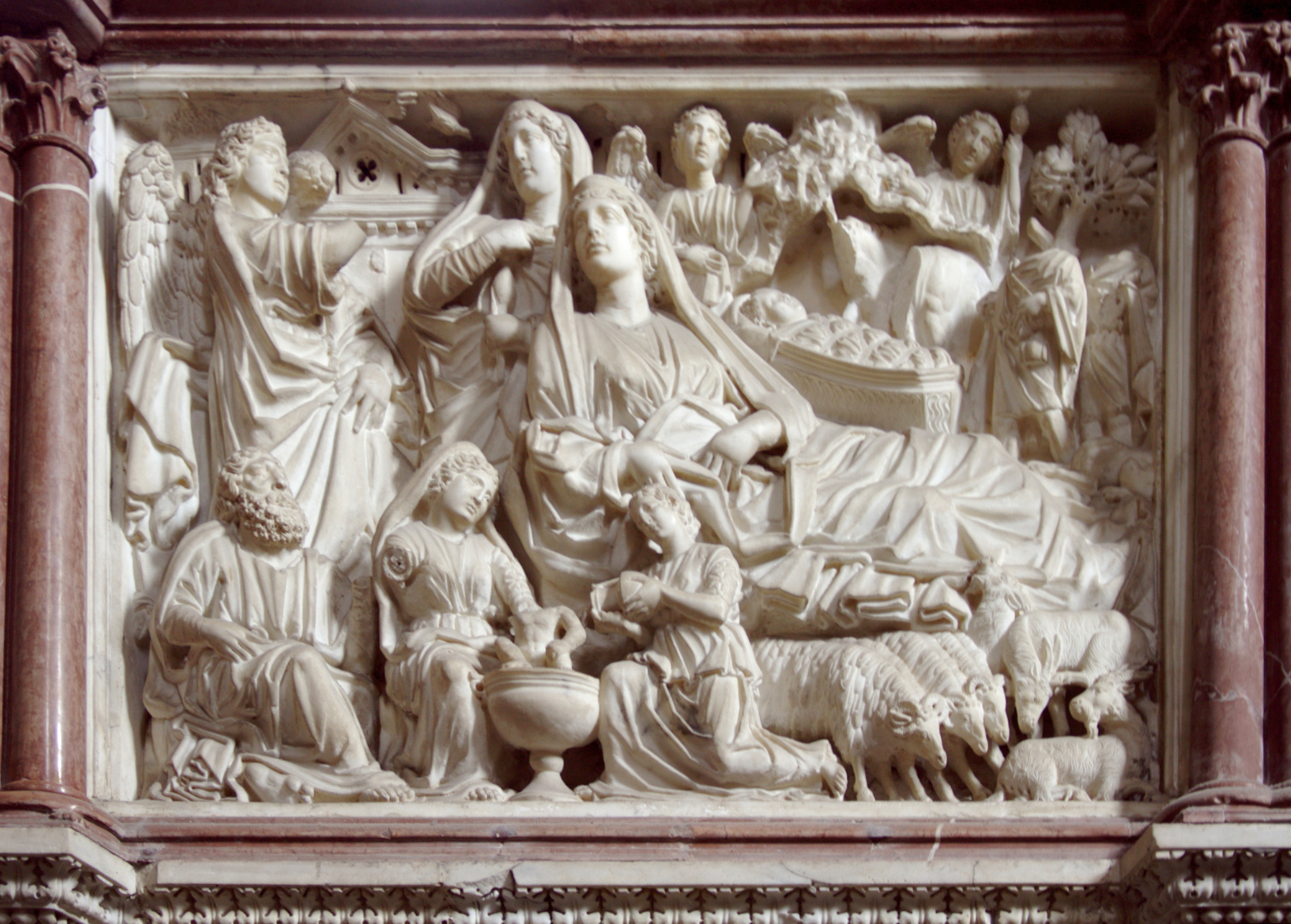
Nicola Pisano, Nativity and Annunciation scene from the pulpit in the Pisa Baptistery, 1260

Reliefs, as opposed to sculpture in the round, were a much larger proportion of fine sculpture than has been the case subsequently. Modern viewers are therefore relatively unused to the form, and inclined to overlook them. Until the Laocoön Group was dug up in the centre of Rome in 1506, the most dramatic and athletic poses in known Roman sculptures were crowded reliefs on Late Roman sarcophagi, while the known statues were nearly all dignified but rather static standing portraits.

Nicola Pisano (active c, 1240s to 1278) was the leading sculptor of what Erwin Panofsky called "the classicizing Proto-Renaissance". His major works were sets of reliefs, especially those on the large raised pulpits of the pulpit in the Pisa Baptistery (dated 1260) and Siena Cathedral Pulpit. He had a large workshop, including his son Giovanni Pisano, and the many sculptures on the Great Fountain at Perugia (1277–1278) were probably designed by Nicola, but mostly carved by them. His larger panels show crowded scenes, sometimes combining scenes in a single composition, for example the Annunciation and Nativity of Christ at the Pisa baptistery; most depictions at this period would have shown two scenes in different compartments. Pisano's youth in his native Apulia in the far south of Italy was passed when Frederick II, Holy Roman Emperor reigned, and mostly lived there, promoting a Roman revival in the arts. Pisano is clearly influenced by study of Ancient Roman sarcophagi.

The Pisa pulpit was probably originally polychrome, which had been usual for Italian Romanesque sculpture. It also seems to have largely carved by Nicola himself. The Arca di San Domenico, a large free-standing tomb monument for Saint Dominic in Bologna, was begun in 1264, though work by many other hands continued for centuries. Nicola and his team completed the reliefs around the sarcophagus.

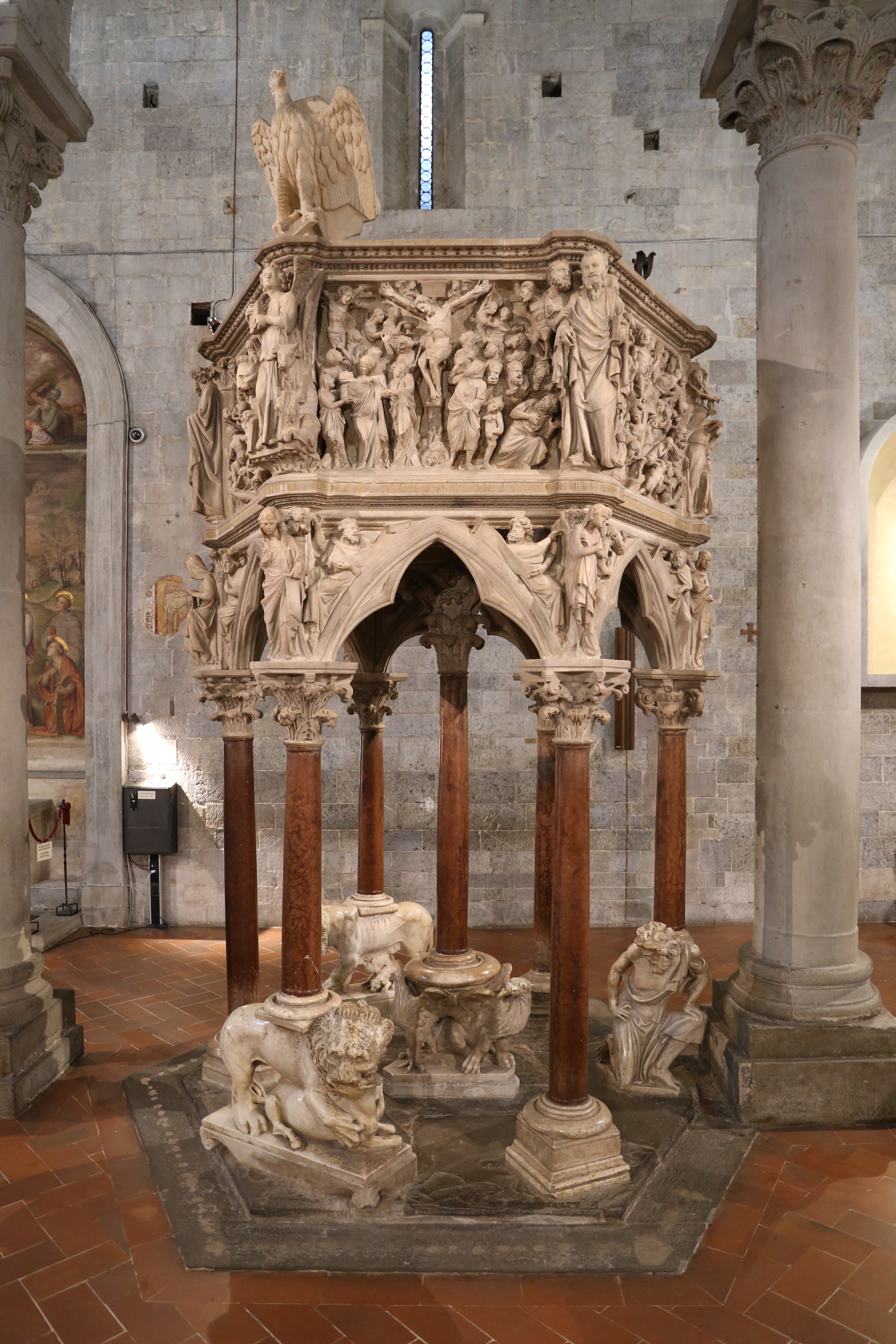
Pulpit of Sant' Andrea, Pistoia, by Giovanni Pisano, 1297-1301

Nicola's son Giovanni Pisano took over his father's workshop in the 1280s, and was much more receptive to Gothic style than his father. His Pulpit of Sant' Andrea, Pistoia is similar in form to his father's ones in Pisa and Siena, but shows a different style. Over the next century Gothic and classical influences were found together in many large works, sometimes in contention.

The other leading sculptor of the period was Arnolfo di Cambio (c. 1240 – 1300/1310), who was also an architect. Born in Tuscany, he also trained with Nicola Pisano, and was his chief assistant on the Siena Cathedral Pulpit. After he began working as an independent master he spent two periods in Rome, bringing the new Tuscan style there. He worked on a number of papal tombs.

== Architecture ==
Italian Gothic architecture began to appear in the early Duecento in northern Italy, under influence from France. The first Italian Gothic edifices were Cistercian abbeys, soon followed by Franciscan and Dominican churches. They spread in the whole Italian territory, often adapting the construction techniques to the local traditions. Brickwork was most common in the Po Valley, while stone prevailed in central Italy and Tuscany, where polychrome wall decoration sometimes continued from the local Romanesque tradition.

The Dominican and Franciscan orders of friars, founded by Saint Dominic and Saint Francis of Assisi respectively, became popular and well-funded in the period, and embarked on large building programmes, mostly using a cheaper and less highly decorated version of Gothic. Large schemes of fresco murals were cheap, and could be used to instruct congregations. The Basilica of Saint Francis of Assisi, in effect two large churches, one above the other on a hilly site, is one of the best examples, begun in 1228 and painted with frescos by Cimabue, Giotto, and others in the next century.

The most important buildings include Chiaravalle Abbey in northern Italy and Casamari Abbey in central Italy. Among the non-Cistercian buildings of this century which were influenced by the Gothic style, though still presenting important Romanesque features, are the Parma Baptistery by Benedetto Antelami and the church of Sant'Andrea in Vercelli, also featuring Antelami's influences.

This century saw the construction of numerous Gothic buildings for the Mendicant Orders. The most important ones include:

- Basilica of San Francesco of Assisi (1228–1253)
- Church of Santa Maria della Spina, Pisa (1230)
- Basilica of Sant'Antonio of Padua
- Church of San Francesco, Bologna (1236–1263)
- Church of Santa Maria Novella, Florence

Also notable is the civil and military construction program promoted by Emperor and King of Sicily Frederick II of Hohenstaufen in southern Italy at the beginning of the century. The most important works promoted by him include:

- Castel del Monte, in Apulia
- Castel Maniace, in Syracuse, Sicily
- City Gate of Capua, an imperial Romanesque evocation of a Roman triumphal arch, in Capua. This is now destroyed though some of the sculpture is in museums.

In this period some cathedrals were also constructed or finished, such as Siena Cathedral.

== Gallery ==
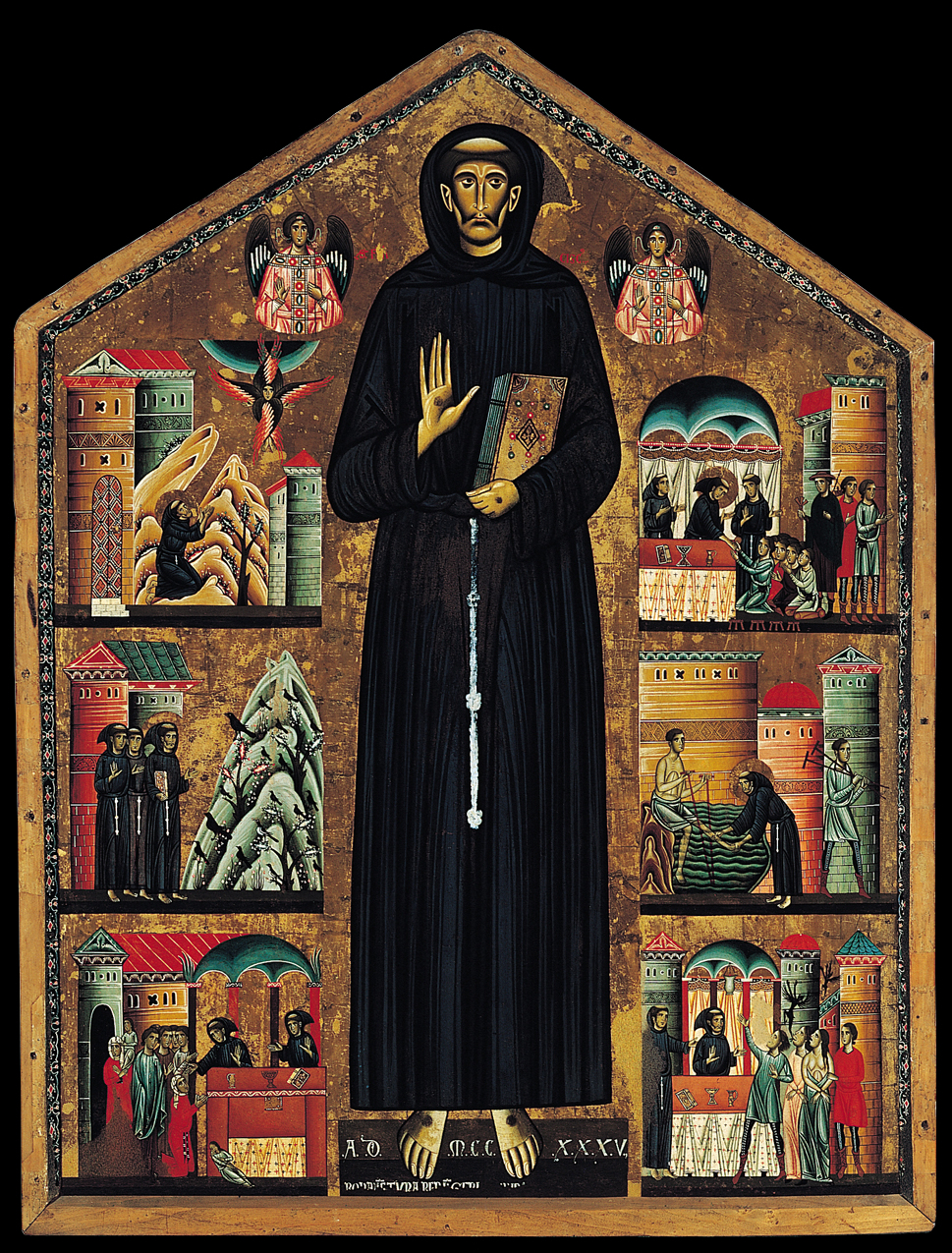
Vita di San Francesco, of Bonaventura Berlinghieri, 1235

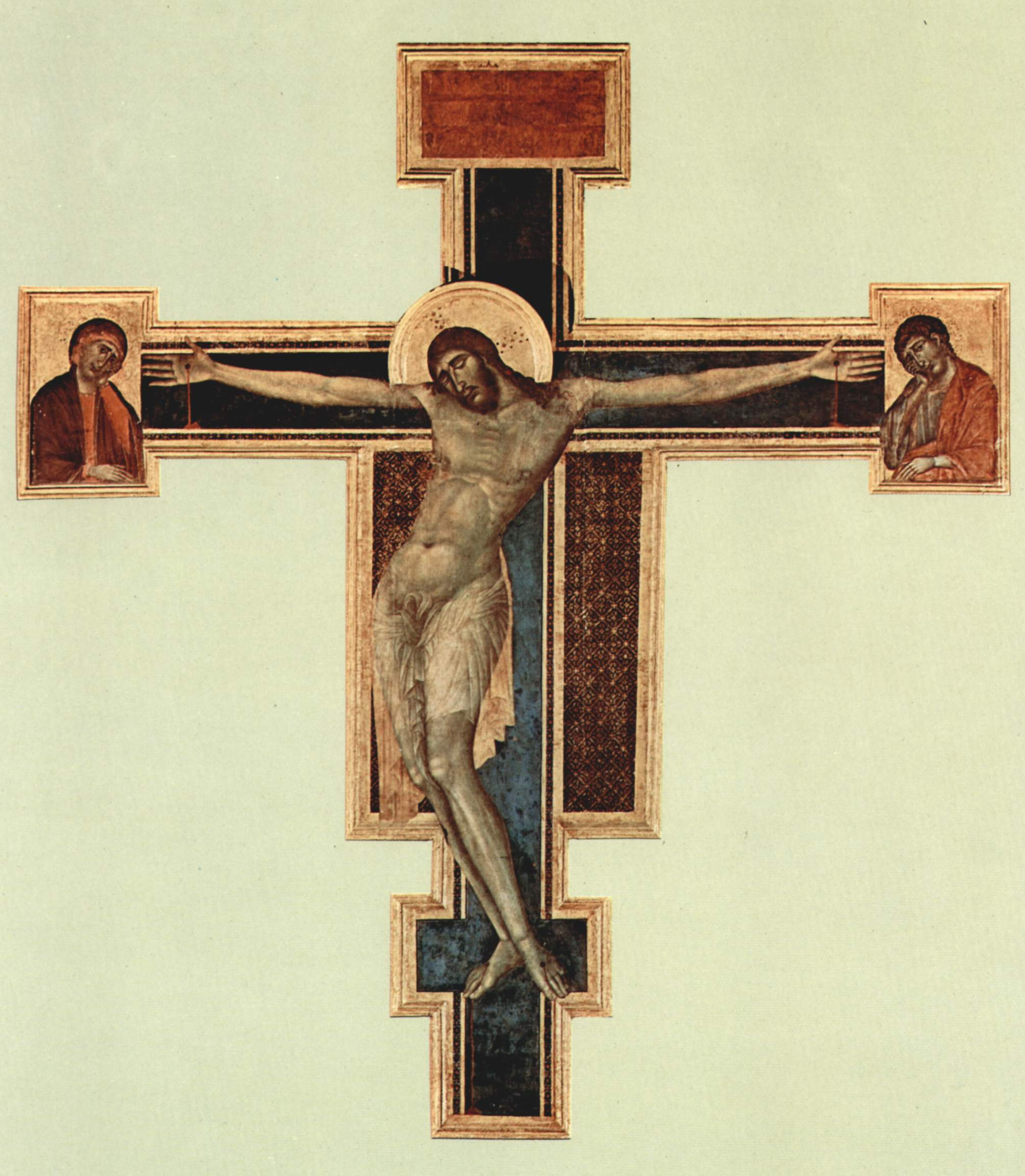
Cross of Santa Croce, of Cimabue

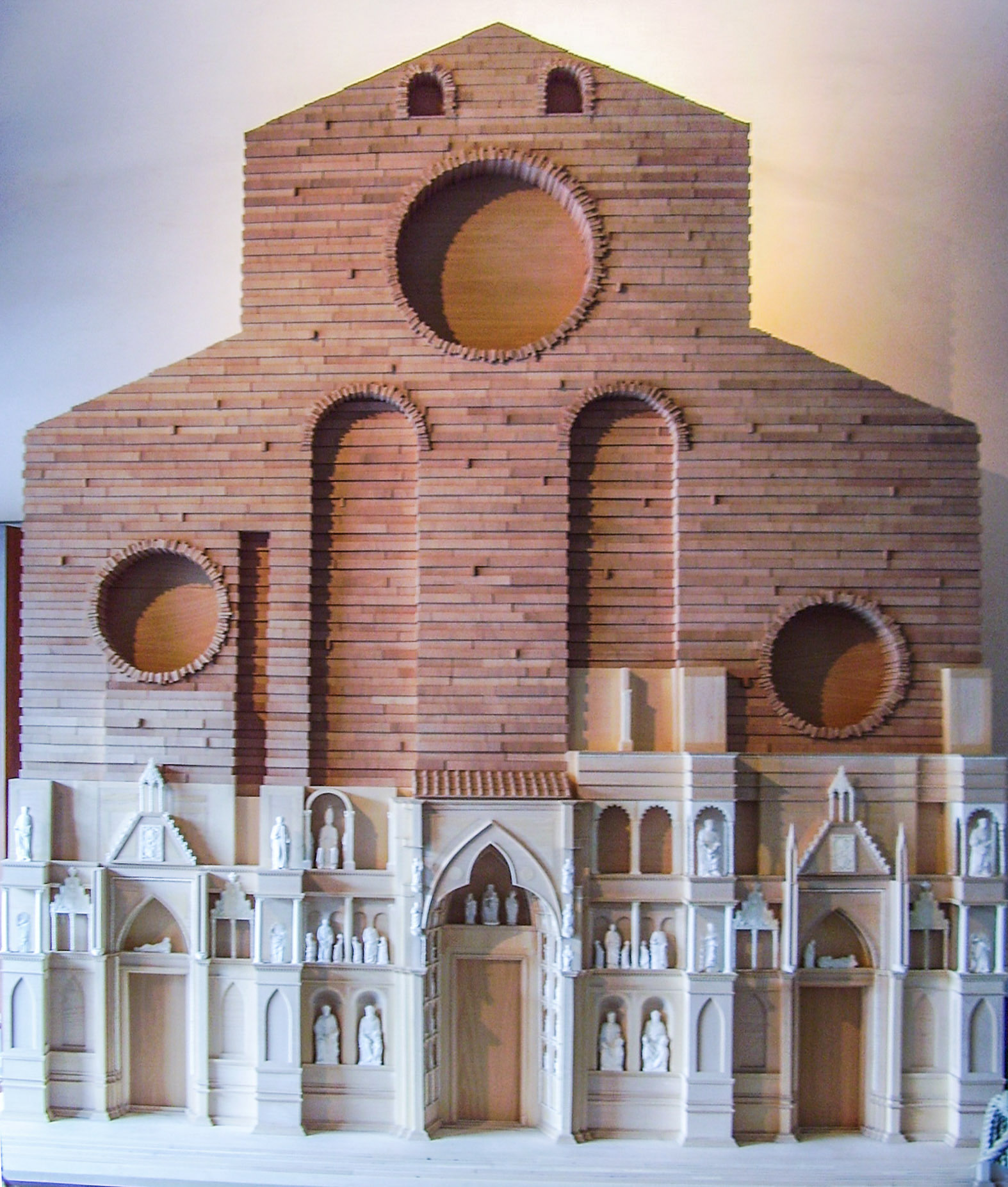
Model of the facade of Florence Cathedral, by Arnolfo di Cambio

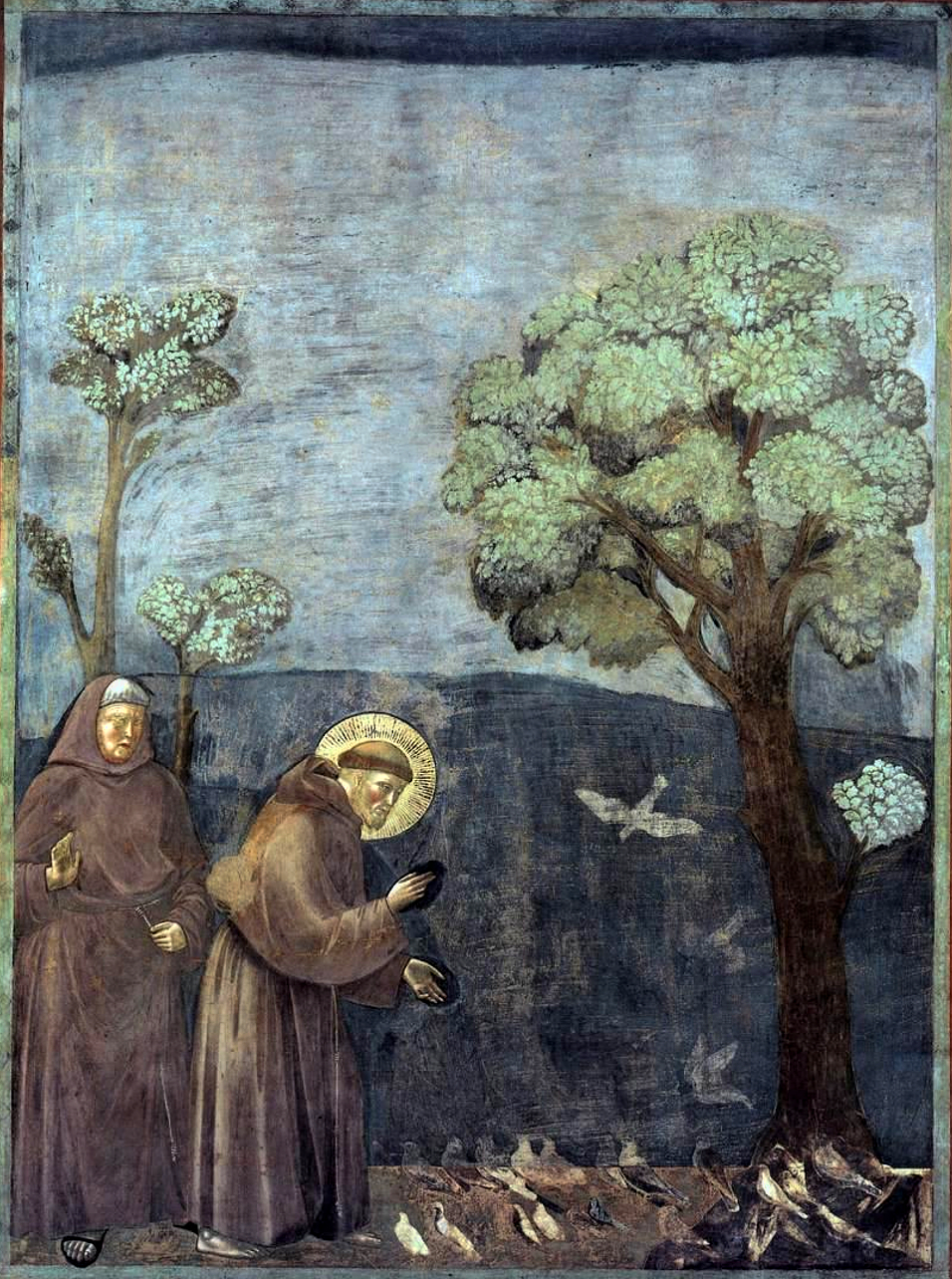
Giotto: St. Francis' Sermon to the Birds

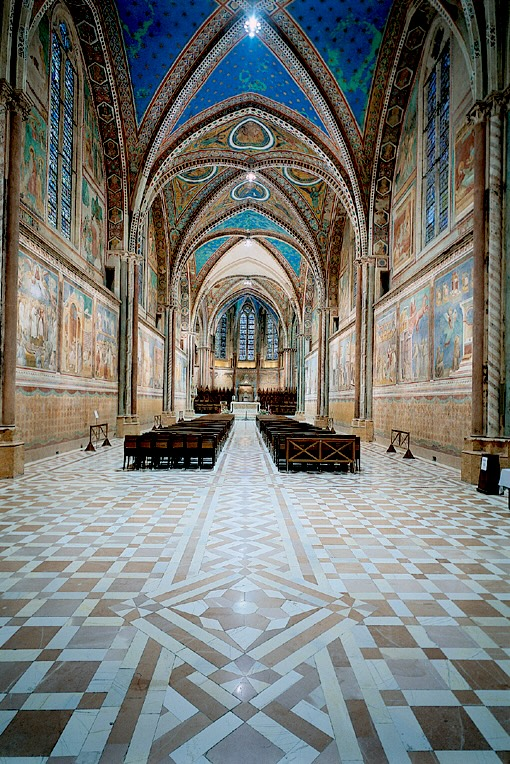
Basilica of San Francesco of Assisi: Nave of the upper basilica (built 1228–1253)

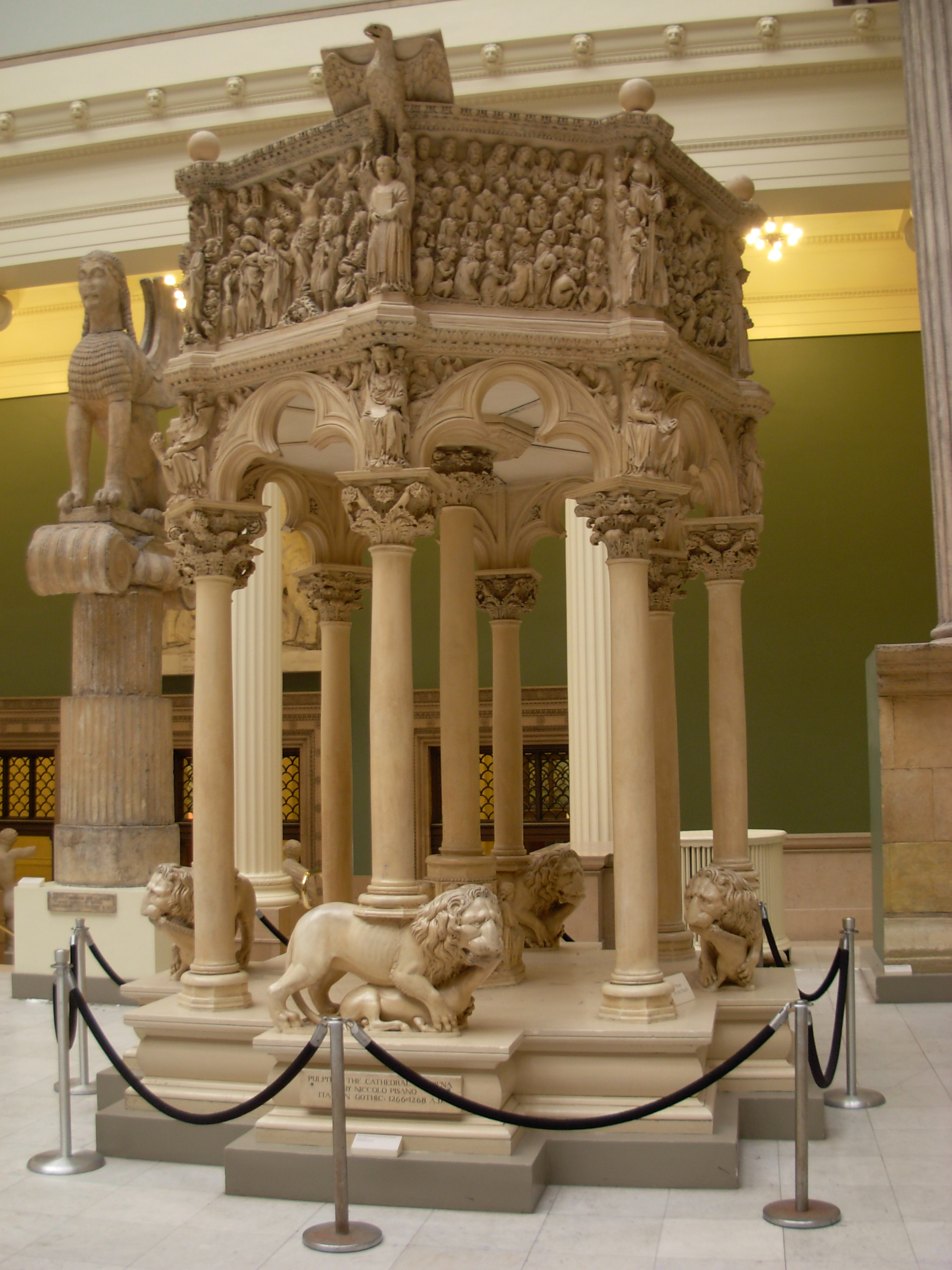
Siena Cathedral Pulpit, by Nicola Pisano

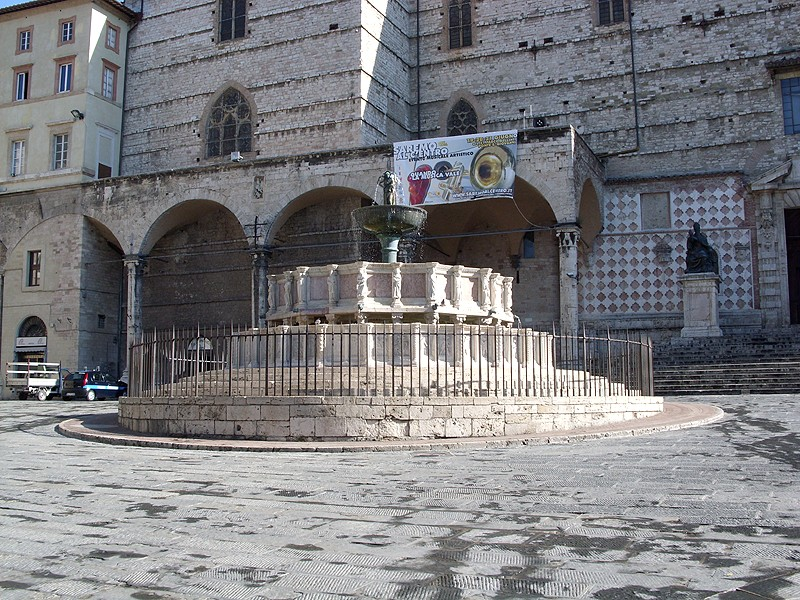
Perugia's Fontana Maggiore, by Pisano

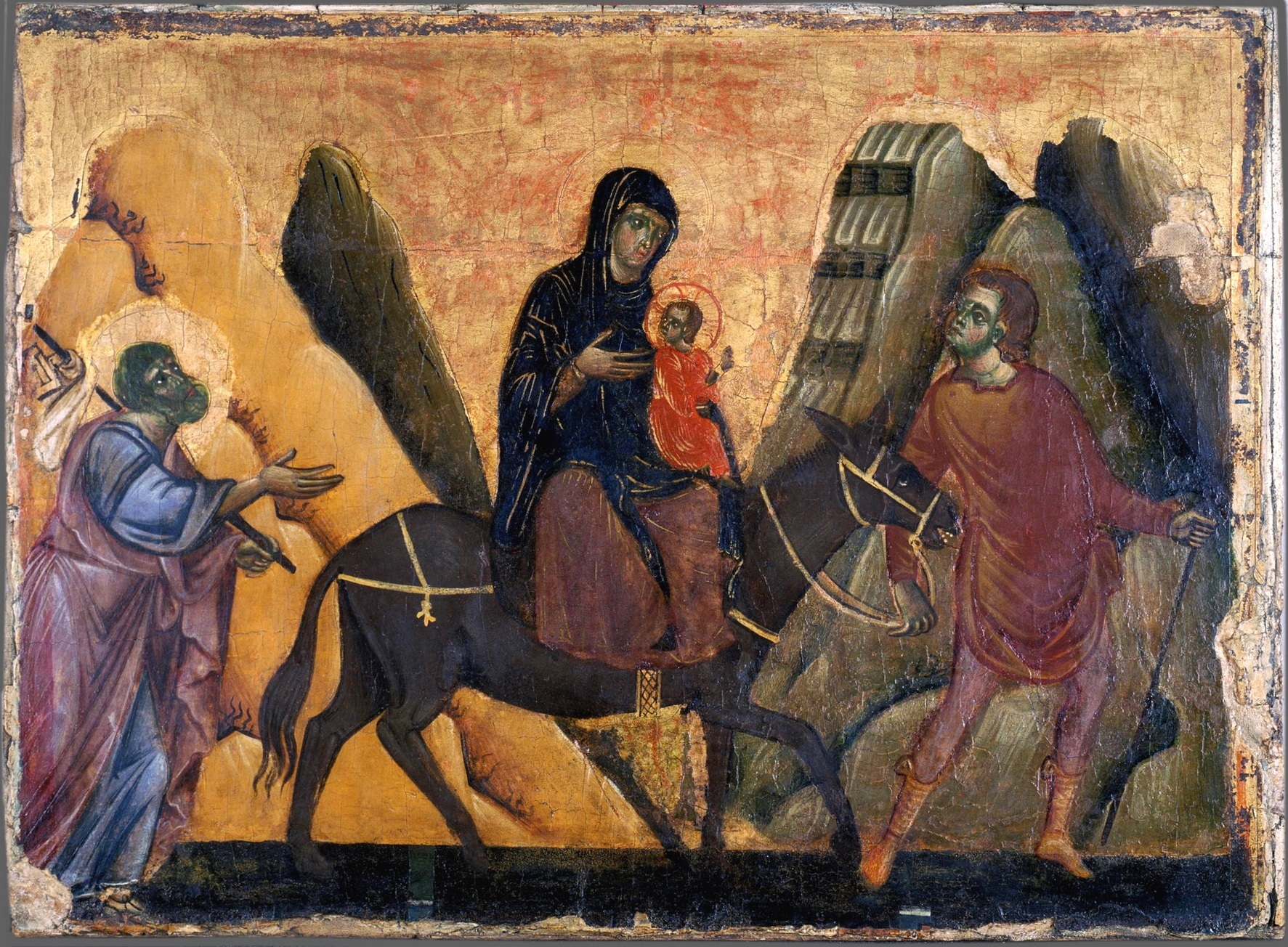
Guido da Siena's "Flight into Egypt"

== See also ==
- Trecento – the 14th century in Italian culture
- Quattrocento – the 15th century in Italian culture
- Cinquecento – the 16th century in Italian culture
- Seicento – the 17th century in Italian culture
- Settecento – the 18th century in Italian culture
- Ottocento – the 19th century in Italian culture
- Novecento – the 20th century in Italian culture
- History of Italy

== Bibliography ==
- Burke, Peter. The Italian Renaissance: Culture and Society in Italy Princeton University Press. Princeton, 1999.
- Shaw, Prue. Reading Dante: From Here to Eternity. Liveright Publishing. New York, 2014 ISBN 978-1-63149-006-4.
- Nolthenius, Helene. ‘’ Duecento: The Late Middle Ages in Italy’’. McGraw-Hill. New York, 1968.
- White, John. Art and Architecture in Italy, 1250 to 1400, London, Penguin Books, 1966, 3rd edn 1993 (now Yale History of Art series). ISBN 0300055854
