= Bonagiunta Orbicciani =

Italian poet (c. 1220 – 1290)

Bonagiunta Orbicciani, also called Bonaggiunta and Urbicciani (c. 1220 in Lucca – 1290), was an Italian poet of the Tuscan School, which drew on the work of the Sicilian School. Fewer than forty of his poems survive.

He appears as a character in Canto 24 of Dante's Purgatorio, where he comments on the dolce stil novo ("sweet new style") of his successors.

== Biography ==
Little is known of his life other than that he was as a judge and notary. He is usually credited with playing a leading role amongst the Siculo-Tuscans who established the high style of lyric poetry in central Italy. His surviving poems betray obvious debts to the Sicilian School, but make more insistent use of nature and animal imagery derived from the troubadours. In a tenzone with Guido Guinizelli he is openly hostile towards the poetic intellectualism that the latter was bringing into vogue.

== Role in Dante's Purgatorio ==
Bonagiunta appears among the gluttons in Canto 24 of Purgatorio, the second canticle of Dante Alighieri's Divine Comedy. Bonagiunta is first pointed out by Forese Donati, who names numerous poets for Dante because their faces are unrecognizable due to their contrapasso: fasting. Bonagiunta appears to recognize Dante, and Dante hears him mumbling what sounds like the word "Gentucca" repeatedly. After Dante encourages Bonagiunta to speak with him, Bonagiunta asks if he is the poet who wrote "Ladies that have intelligence of love," a poem from Dante's Vita Nuova. After Dante confirms his identity, Bonagiunta remarks that he finally understands what separated his poetry and the poetries of Giacomo da Lentini and Guittone d'Arezzo from Dante's dolce stil novo ("sweet new style"). Once he has finished praising Dante, he is silent.

Bonagiunta's presence within Purgatorio addresses the differences between Dante's poetic style and the style of his Italian predecessors. Both early and modern commentators have suggested that Bonagiunta was included in the Divine Comedy as the result of his tenzoni with Dante and Guido Guinizzelli, another practitioner of the dolce stil novo. Dante, who had previously argued in his De vulgari eloquentia that Bonagiunta's poetry overutilizes abstract terminology and does not live up to poetry's fullest potential, has Bonagiunta praise Dante (the character) and remark that he has a newfound understanding and appreciation of his dolce stil novo in Canto 24. Robert Hollander, a Dante scholar, lists five possible hypotheses regarding Dante's use of the specific phrase dolce stil novo through the mouth of Bonagiunta: Dante is using the now-defined phrase for the first time in Italian; he intends to suggest a group of poets that includes himself and Cino da Pistoia that is separate from Bonagiunta and other poets; he is presenting himself as a uniquely theological poet, one whose abilities supersede those of traditional love poets; he believes that the word "style" denotes not just a way of writing, but also the content within a poem; and that the phrase may be used by Dante to specifically refer to his own poetry. In "Dante and Bonagiunta," James Eustace Shaw determines that Bonagiunta's praise for Dante and the dolce stil novo stems from a heightened understanding of love that he attained while atoning for his sins on the sixth terrace of Mount Purgatory.

== Bibliography ==
- Hainsworth, Peter (2002). "Bonagiunta da Lucca". The Oxford Companion to Italian Literature. Oxford: Oxford University Press.
