= Davanzati =

Davanzati is a surname. Notable people with the surname include:

- Bernardo Davanzati (1529 – 1606), Italian economist and translator
- Chiaro Davanzati (died 1304), Italian poet
- Roberto Forges Davanzati (1880–1936), Italian journalist, academic and politician

== See also ==
- Palazzo Davanzati
