= Stefano Protonotaro da Messina =

Italian poet of the Sicilian School

Stefano Protonotaro da Messina (fl. 1261) was a poet of the Sicilian School, probably at the court of Frederick II. He left behind only three (or four) poems, but one is the earliest piece of writing in the Sicilian language. This work is of immense philological and linguistic importance.

== Life ==
He was born at Messina in the Kingdom of Sicily and was, as his name implies, a protonotary. He is mentioned in only two documents: one of 1261 from Messina, while he was a live, and a posthumous one from 1301 (probably near the date of his death). If he is the same person, as seems probable, as a "Stefano da Messina" mentioned in other documents, he made Latin and Greek translations of two Arabic treatise on astronomy—Liber rivolutionum (Book of Revolutions) and Flores astronomiae (Flowers of Astronomy)—which he dedicated to King Manfred, son of Frederick II. He was probably one of the later Sicilian poets, since one of his commiate (addresses to a lover) shows the influence of Guittone d'Arezzo.

== Work and context ==
The poets of the Sicilian School usually composed in the Sicilian language. At a time when all the Italian languages were very similar, Tuscan copyists altered the Sicilian word endings and other orthographic conventions to produce Tuscanised texts. Stefano's canzone Pir meu cori alligrari, is the only work of the Sicilian School that is preserved in both Sicilian (which has five vowel sounds) and Tuscan (which has seven). Gian Maria Barbieri reported to have found it in a "libro siciliano", probably an Occitan chansonnier from Sicily, and copied it. This copy was first printed in 1790 by Gerolamo Tiraboschi. The original has since been lost. Pir meu is written in coblas unissonans, with two feet of abC form and a sirma that is dDEeFF, followed by a tornada that is identical in structure. One of the central images in the piece is that of la dulzuri / chi fa la tigra in illu miraturi: "the delight / that the tigress has in her own mirror". Stefano likens seeing his lady for the first time to this delight. This image was first employed in a canso of Rigaut de Barbezieux: the tigress is said to be enchanted by her own beautiful stripes and so be forget about the hunters that pursue her. The mirror image may also be used to structure the motifs of the poem, the second half being a motivic mirror-image of the first. While Pir meu is written in the standardised Sicilian of court poetry, the volgare (siciliano) illustre, the first stanza shows hints of the common tongue (siciliana-comune). Stefano's poem has been used, with varying degrees of liberty, to re-create Sicilian versions of the Tuscanised legacy of other Sicilian poets.

Besides Pir meu, Stefano left two other songs, Assai cretti celare and Assai mi placeria. A fourth, Amor, da cui move tuttora e vene, customarily assigned to Pier delle Vigne, has been lately ascribed to Stefano. It is characterised among his works for its dependence on bestiaries for creating simile and image. He alludes to a deer and a unicorn.
