= Terino da Castelfiorentino =

Florentine poet

Terino da Castelfiorentino (born 1230s/1240s) was a Florentine poet from Castelfiorentino in the Valdelsa. The only biographical document concerning Terino was in the past dated to either 1268 or 1270, but a date of April 1281 has since been settled on. This notice was first publicised by Santorre Debenedetti. It shows that Terino was a cloth seller in Florence at the time. He is recorded as Terino f. Nevaldi di castè fiorentini. His father Nevaldo matriculated in the Arte della Seta in 1225. His son Truccio entered the Arte dei Giudici e Notaj in 1302. A document of 1 June 1362 refers to a Terio and a Giovanni of Castelfiorentino, probably younger sons of Terino.

He had a tenzone with Monte Andrea di Firenze and another with Onesto da Bologna. He penned a response, Naturalmente chere ogni amadore, to the first sonnet in the Vita nuova of Dante Alighieri, but this has sometimes been assigned instead to Cino da Pistoia.
