= Compagnetto da Prato =

Italian poet

Compagnetto da Prato was an Italian poet of the Sicilian school in the court of emperor Frederick II, maybe a jester. Two of his poems, L'amor fa una donna amare and Per lo marito c'ò rio, are known.
