= Giacomino Pugliese =

13th century poet

Giacomino Pugliese was one of the most notable poets to come out of the Sicilian school for Italian poetry during the early years of the 13th century. Even though not much is known about his life, his poems have been passed down through Italian teachings. Many of his poems still exist and are stored in the Vatican archives.

== Poetry ==
Even though little information can be drawn about his actual life, a lot can be taken from his poems. Most of his work told stories about love, and the struggles of life. What made his poetry unique and separate from the norm was the expression of true feelings and emotion. His use of informal structure in his poems made it more relatable to the common person. Of his eight total works the one that stands out the most is "Death, why have you made so great a war against me". (Trans.) This poem stands out more than the rest due to the use of real emotion and shocking truth about the passing of a loved one. Also a unique quality of his poetry was the implementation of music. Nearly half of his works were originally meant to be songs.
