= Dinus de Rossonis =

Dinus de Rossonis or Mugellanus was an Italian jurist of the late 13th century.

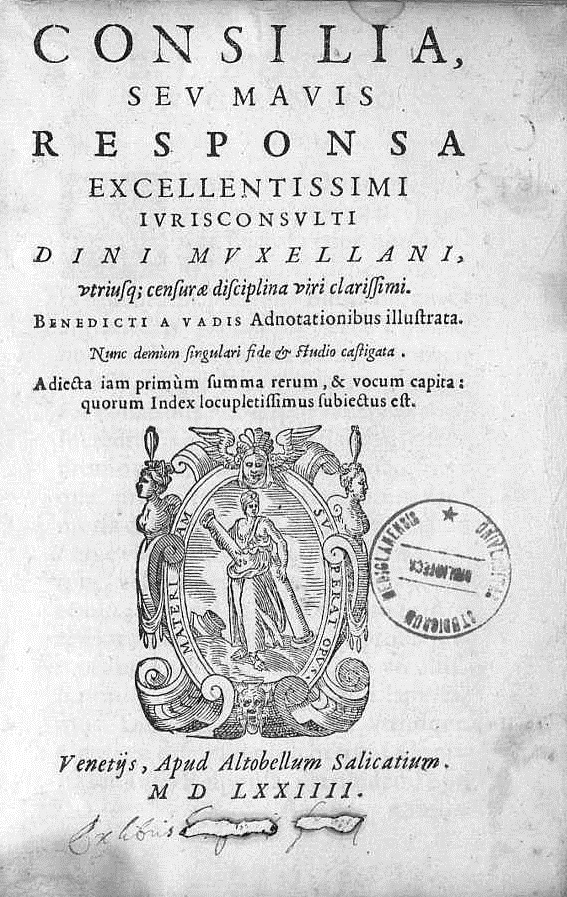
Consilia, 1574

He studied civil law at Bologna University up until 1278, before teaching law at Pistoia (1279–1284) and Bologna (1284–96), where he taught Cino da Pistoia and where he is recorded in 1289 as the first civil law teacher to draw a salary.

In 1296, he appears to have joined the clergy and his wife a nunnery. In Rome, he taught at the papal school. He may have helped prepare the Liber Sextus, Pope Boniface VIII's third volume of the Canon Code, which he later wrote a commentary on. He is last recorded in Bologna in 1298.

== Works ==
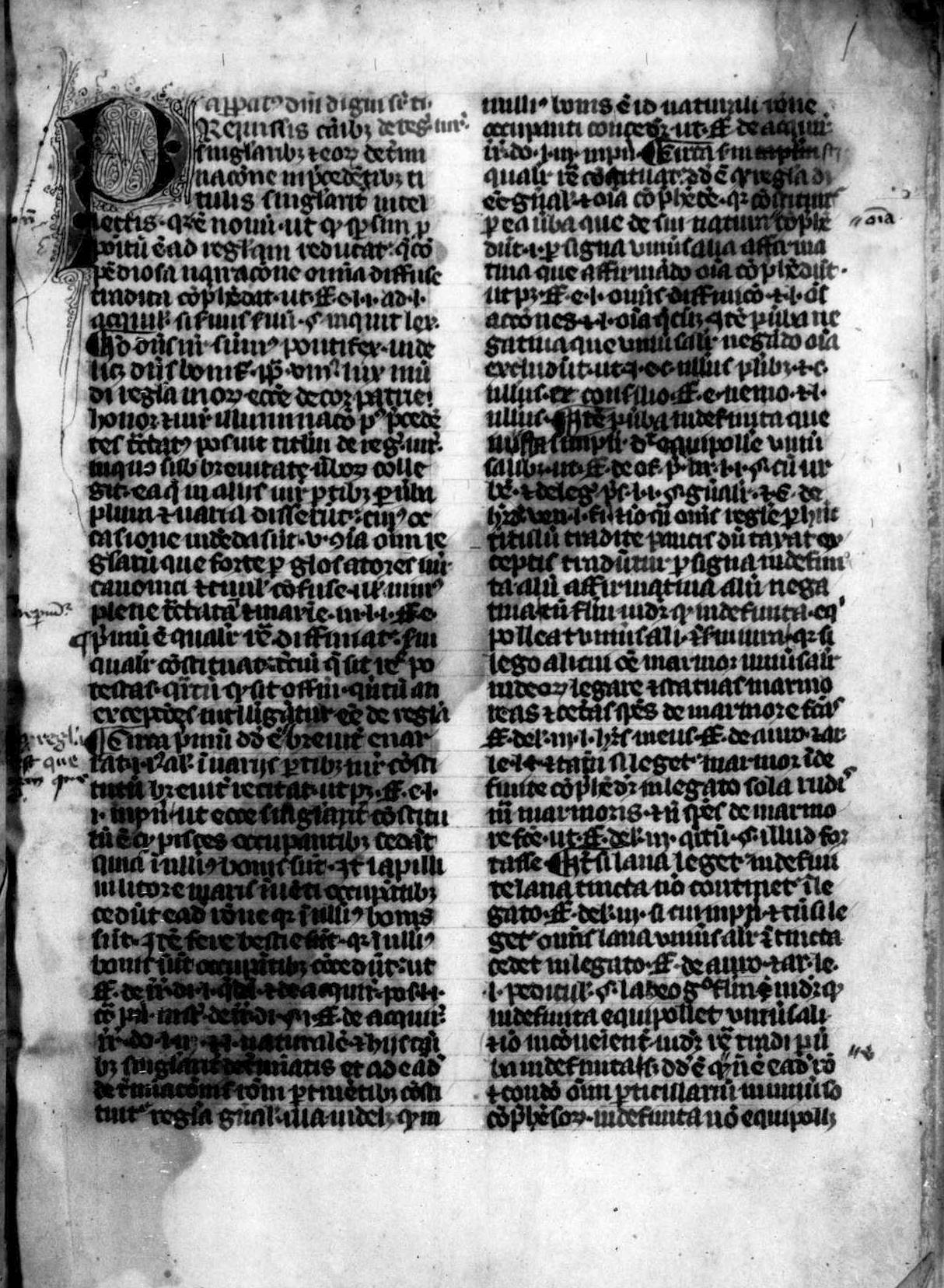
Apparatus super titulum De regulis iuris, 14th-century manuscript. Laon, Bibliothèque municipale.

- Super infortiato et digesto novo, Bologna, 1971.
- Commentarii in regulas juris, Coloniae, 1617.
- Consilia,.., Lugduni, 1551.
  - Consilia (in Latin). Venice: Altobello Salicato. 1574.
- Tractatus de interesse, 1549.
- Tractatus de glossis contrariis, 1549.
- Tractatus authenticus de successionibus ab intestato, 1549.
- De regulis juris,.., Lugduni, 1533.
- Preclarus & insignis tractatus allegabilis et quotidianus de regulis iuris ..., 1527.
- Rubrice totius juris canonici et civilis, J. Petit, 1512.
- Ordo judiciorum
