= Sicilian School =

Community of Sicilian poets

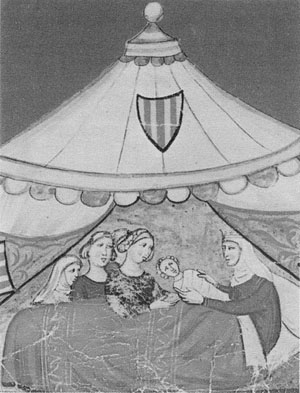
The birth of Frederick II, Holy Roman Emperor and King of Sicily

The Sicilian School was a small community of Sicilian and mainland Italian poets gathered around Frederick II, most of them belonging to his imperial court in Palermo. Headed by Giacomo da Lentini, they produced more than 300 poems of courtly love between 1230 and 1266, the experiment being continued after Frederick's death by his son, Manfred. It is considered the beginning of Sicilian-language literature.

== Origins ==
These poets drew inspiration from the troubadour poetry of Occitania written in langue d'oc, which applied the feudal code of honor to the relation between a man (acting as the vassal) and a woman (acting as king or superior). This is a reversal of the traditional role of women, traditionally dependent on men, and marks a new awareness in medieval society: the decadence of feudalism with the increasing power of the middle class, causes a shift in the reading public, the epic (traditionally devoted to great military pursuits) gradually giving way to the lyric (generally focused on love). In the lower Middle Ages more and more women were reading books than ever before and poetry tried to adapt to their point of view and their newly acquired role in society.

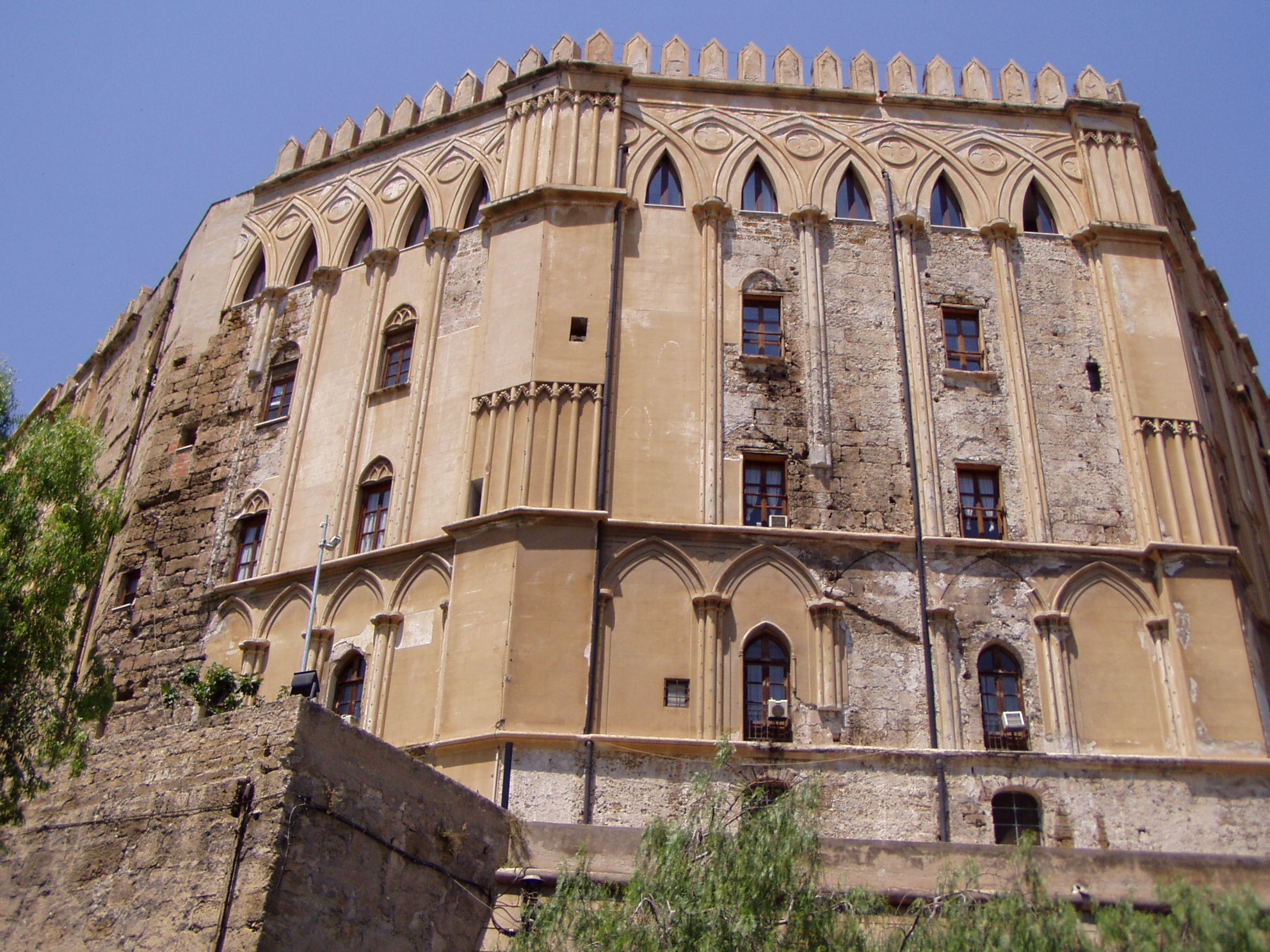
Palazzo dei Normanni, one of the places that hosted Frederick's Magna Curia

This features Occitan poetry, then very influential in Italy. What distinguishes the Sicilian School from the troubadours, however, is the introduction of a kinder, gentler type of woman than that found in their Occitan models; one who was nearer to Dante's madonnas and Petrarch's Laura, though much less characterised psychologically. The poems of the Sicilians hardly portray real women or situations (Frederick's song cannot be read as autobiographical), but the style and language are remarkable, since the Sicilians (as Dante called them) created the first Italian literary standard by enriching the existing vernacular base, probably inspired by popular love songs, with new words of Latin and Provençal origin.

== The work of a roving school ==
"It is lyric poetry to be in the forefront of literature, inspiring a widespread enthusiasm whose effects will be felt for centuries. The initial boost given by the Sicilian poets from the Svevs' court, the first to use a standardised vernacular to make art poetry will be passed on to many others: and all of them, not just the pedantic imitators of the Siculo-Tuscan school (such as Bonagiunta Orbicciani) but also Guinizzelli, the poets of Dolce Stil Novo and more widely all writers of verse, will have to deal, though by different degrees, with the Sicilian models, so that some peculiarities will be assimilated into standard usage of Italian poetry." (Bruno Migliorini, Storia della letteratura italiana)

Though yet confined to a few notaries and dignitaries of the emperors, such poetry shows for the first time uniform linguistic traits and a richness in vocabulary far exceeding that of the Sicilian language by which it was inspired. The Magna curia was not based in any given city, but always moving across Southern Italy, a fact which helped the school avoid the temptation of choosing any local dialect as the starting point for their new language. That is why the new standard was a Koiné language, a melting pot of many different vernaculars.

The reason for moving from city to city was mainly political. Although his experiment was short-lived, Frederic successfully created the first modern state in Europe, run by an efficient bureaucracy: its members were neither appointed from the aristocracy nor the clergy with good reason, since the former were far more interested in defending their own privileges than the welfare of the country and often plotted against him in the hope of regaining their power, while the latter were basically faithful to the Pope, his biggest enemy.

Frederic was in fact dismantling the feudal system of government inherited from the Normans, his magna curia and minor dignitaries were usually chosen from lay orders (like his poet-notaries). He also abolished internal barriers: free trade brought prosperity to the South, making Bari (as witnessed by Cielo in his Contrasto) one of the richest cities in the Mediterranean. But, keeping this modern state afloat, meant that his barons had no power to collect taxes, their greatest source of revenues. Hence the necessity for Frederick to bring law and order by moving his court to and fro.

== Style and subject-matter ==
Though the Sicilian School is generally considered conventional in theme or content it rather "stands out for his refined lexicon, near to the style of trobar clus and for the wise treatment of figures of speech and metaphors of stylnovistic taste taken from natural philosophy" (Cesare Segre). There is a visible move towards neoplatonic models, which will be embraced by Dolce Stil Novo in the later 13th century Bologna and Florence, and more markedly by Petrarch. Unlike the Northern Italian troubadours, no line is ever written in Occitan. Rather, the Occitan repertoire of chivalry terms is adapted to the Siculo-Italian phonetics and morphology, so that new Italian words are actually coined, some adapted, but none really loaned. A most famous specimen is Io m'aggio posto in core by Giacomo da Lentini, who apparently inspired the movement. Giacomo da Lentini is also widely credited by scholars (as Francesco Bruni, Cesare Segre et al.) for inventing the sonnet, a literary form later perfected by Dante and, most of all, Petrarch. He uses it in a number of poems. We quote here the most famous that probably inspired the whole school:

Io m'aggio posto in core a Dio servire,
com'io potesse gire in paradiso,
al santo loco c'aggio audito dire,
o' si mantien sollazzo, gioco e riso.
sanza mia donna non vi voria gire,
quella c'ha blonda testa e claro viso,
che sanza lei non poteria gaudere,
estando da la mia donna diviso.
Ma no lo dico a tale intendimento,
perch'io pecato ci volesse fare;
se non veder lo suo bel portamento
e lo bel viso e 'l morbido sguardare:
che 'l mi teria in gran consolamento,
veggendo la mia donna in ghiora stare.

Translation:

I have a place in my heart for God reserved,
So that I may go to Heaven,
To the Holy Place where, I have heard,
People are always happy and joyous and merry.
I wouldn't want to go there without my lady
The one with fair hair and pale complexion,
Because without her I could never be happy,
Being separated from my lady.
But I do not say that with blasphemous intent,
As if I wanted to sin with her:
If I did not see her shapely figure
And her beautiful face and tender look:
Since it would greatly comfort me
To see my woman shine in glory.

== The limitations of Sicilian poetry ==
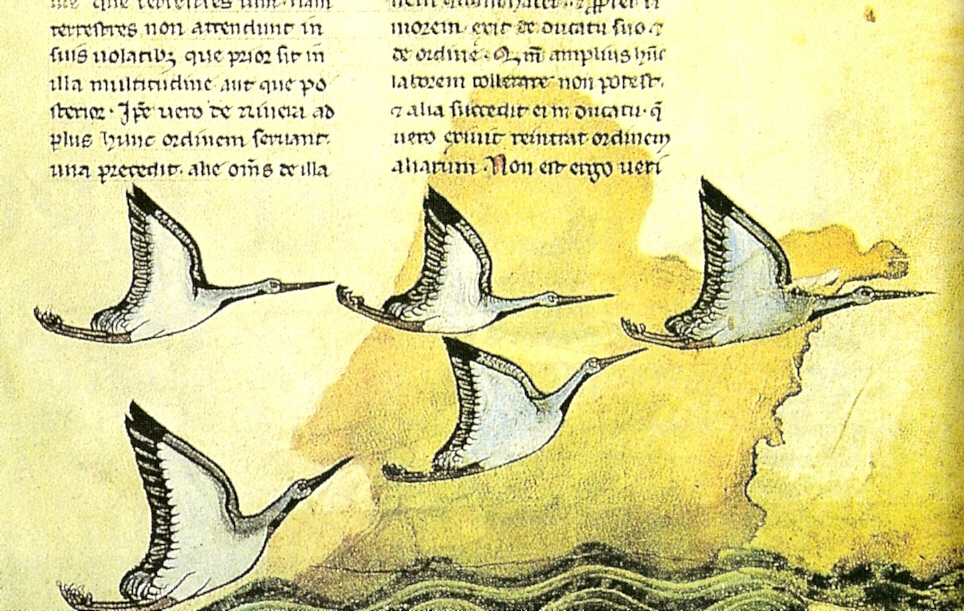
De arte venandi cum avibus of Frederick II

The main inhibiting factor on Sicilian poetry was probably the political censorship imposed by Frederick: literary debate was confined to courtly love. In this respect, the poetry of the north, though stuck to the langues d'oïl, provided fresher blood for satire. The north was fragmented into communes or little city-states which had a relatively democratic self-government, and that is precisely why the sirventese genre, and later, Dante's Divina Commedia and sonnets were so popular: they referred to real people and feelings, though often idealised like Beatrice. A sirventese is, in effect, eminently political: it usually refers to real battles and attacks real military or political enemies, the author often being the soldier or the knight involved in the strife, as in Guittone d'Arezzo's Rotta di Montaperti (Defeat of Montaperti), a bloody battle where Manfred of Sicily, Frederick's son, defeated the Guelphs. Dante commemorated this event in his epic La Divina Commedia many years later.

Frederick's censorship is also apparent from the structure of the song: the Sicilians transformed the tornada, the strophe which in troubadour poetry contains a dedication to a famous person with a congedo, where the poet bids goodbye to his reader and asks the song to bear his message to his lady. The re-shaping of the Occitan language model also involved the suppression of music. The authors' work was intended for reading, which called for logical unity, posing a question, proposing, and finding a solution in the end.

That meant no interchangeable lines as in troubadour poetry and fewer repetitions: for a Occitan joglar who sang his poems these were necessary, but they sounded redundant to the Sicilian authors. Their legacy is apparent in Dante and Petrarch's lyrics. The sonnet is even more exacting on this point: the separation between the octave and the sestet is purely a logical one, the rimes drawing a visual line between the first and last part. However, the fact that Italian poetry was being made for the reading public may have facilitated its circulation.

== Realism and parody: Cielo d'Alcamo ==
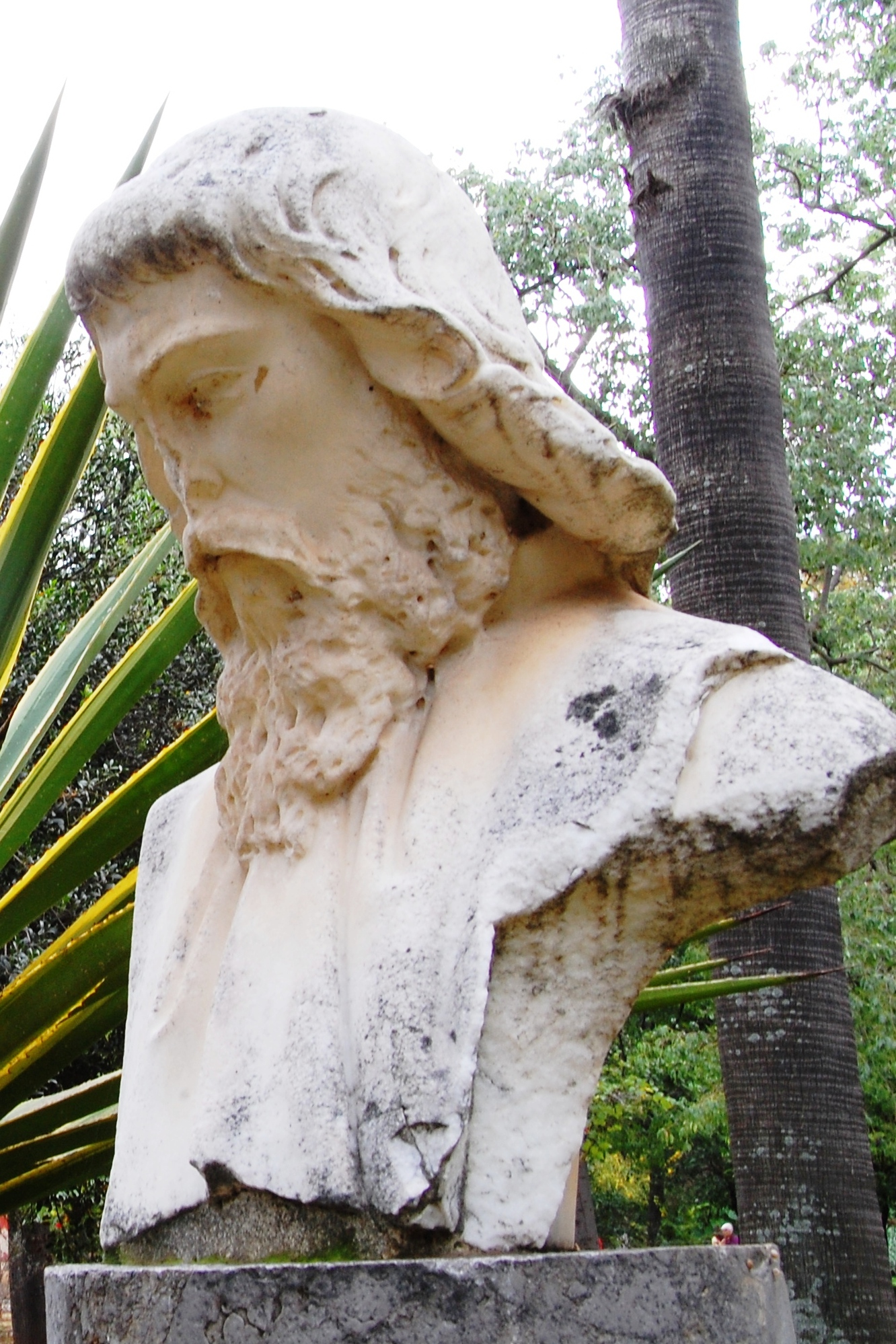
Cielo d'Alcamo at the Villa Giulia

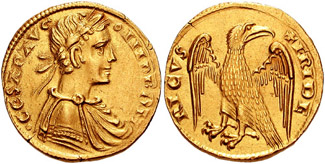
Frederick's Augustale (c. 1250), a valued currency widely used throughout Italy is mentioned in the Contrasto, and helped scholars establish its date.

Though lyric poetry prevailed at Frederick's (and later Manfredi's) court, it is at this time that we have an interesting exception in Rosa fresca aulentissima (transl: "Fresh very perfumed rose"), widely known as Contrasto and attributed to Cielo d'Alcamo (also known as Ciullu di Vincenzullu. The modern form of "Cielo" is "Michele".), about which modern critics have much exercised themselves. This Contrasto is written in a Sicilian language close to that spoken in the city of Messina, with several influences from mainland Italian dialects. The subject is humorous debate between two young lovers, a kind of poetry quite common in the Middle Ages (as contrasti or pastorelle). Similarly to the balcony scene from William Shakespeare's Romeo and Juliet, a young suitor sneaks into the garden of a young lady from a noble family and declares his love for her. He tries to seduce the girl with one-liners, each of them a brutal parody of the Sicilian School's clichés relating to love poetry. In reply, the girl berates him for his "ill" intentions, vowing to protect her honour, but her prudishness is just a façade to force her admirer to keep trying harder, until at last she gives in completely to his bold advances. The language lampoons the courtly language of lyric poetry. The Contrasto belongs to the time of the emperor Frederick II (it can be dated between 1230 and 1250, but probably closer to the latter), and is also important as a proof that there once existed a popular, independent of literary, poetry prior to Frederick's times. Now most critics agree that the Contrasto of Cielo d'Alcamo is probably a scholarly re-elaboration of some lost popular song. It is perhaps the closest to a kind of poetry that has perished or which was smothered by the Sicilian literature of Frederick's. Its distinguishing feature was its hilarity and down-to-earthedness as opposed to the abstract verse of the Sicilian School. But it has been argued that its style betrays a profound knowledge of Frederick's movement and some critics have hinted the man who penned it must have been acquainted with or even been part of, the court itself. Given the highly satiric and erotic vein Ciullo d'Alcamo may well be a fictitious name. His Contrasto shows vigor and freshness in the expression of feelings: Such "low" treatment of the love-theme shows that its subject-matter is certainly popular. This poem sounds real and spontaneous, marked as it is by the sensuality characteristic of the people of southern Italy.

== Linguistic notes on the Sicilian standard ==
The standard of the Sicilian school combines many traits typical of the Sicilian, Latin, Provençal and to a lesser, but not negligible extent, Apulian and certain southern dialects. Such a melting pot greatly helped the new Italian language: the Occitan suffixes -ièra and -ça, for example, generated hundreds of new Italian words in -iera and -za as it. riv-iera ("river") or costan-za ("constancy"). Such affixes would be then adopted by Dante and his contemporaries, and handed on to future generations of Italian writers. Dante's styles illustre, cardinale, aulico, curiale were partly developed from his close study of the Sicilian School which he quotes widely in his studies, especially in his De Vulgari Eloquentia. The Sicilian school was later re-founded by Guittone d'Arezzo in Tuscany following the death of Manfredi, Frederick's son, so many of these poems were later copied in manuscripts that widely circulated in Florence. This first standard in which they were written, was, however, modified in Tuscany. In fact, Tuscan scriveners perceived the five-vowel system used by southern Italian dialects (i, e, a, o, u) as a seven-vowel one (i, é, è, a, ó, ò, u). As a consequence, the Italian texts may contain lines that no longer rhyme with each other (sic. -i > tusc. -é, sic. -u > tusc. -ó). Tuscans also changed words as gloria [pron. glɔria] to ghiora, aju [pron. aju] ("I have) to aggio [pron. addʒo] etc. Though some original texts have been restored to their original Sicilian, we must see such remakes only as tentative reconstructions of originals that, unfortunately, may have been lost forever. Dante and his contemporaries would take this newborn language a step further, expanding and enriching it with even more words of Latin and Florentine origin, carefully working on the style to create volgare illustre, a higher standard quite close to today's Standard Italian.

== Poets ==
- Arrigo Testa
- Cielo d'Alcamo
- Compagnetto da Prato
- Enzo, king of Sardinia
- Frederick II, emperor
- Giacomino Pugliese
- Giacomo da Lentini
- Guido delle Colonne
- Inghilfredi
- Jacopo Mostacci
- Manfred, king of Sicily
- Mazzeo Ricco
- Odo delle Colonne
- Perceval Doria
- Pier delle Vigne
- Rinaldo d'Aquino
- Rugieri d'Amici
- Stefano Protonotaro

== See also ==
- Cultural depictions of Frederick II, Holy Roman Emperor
