= Guido Guinizelli =

Italian love poet

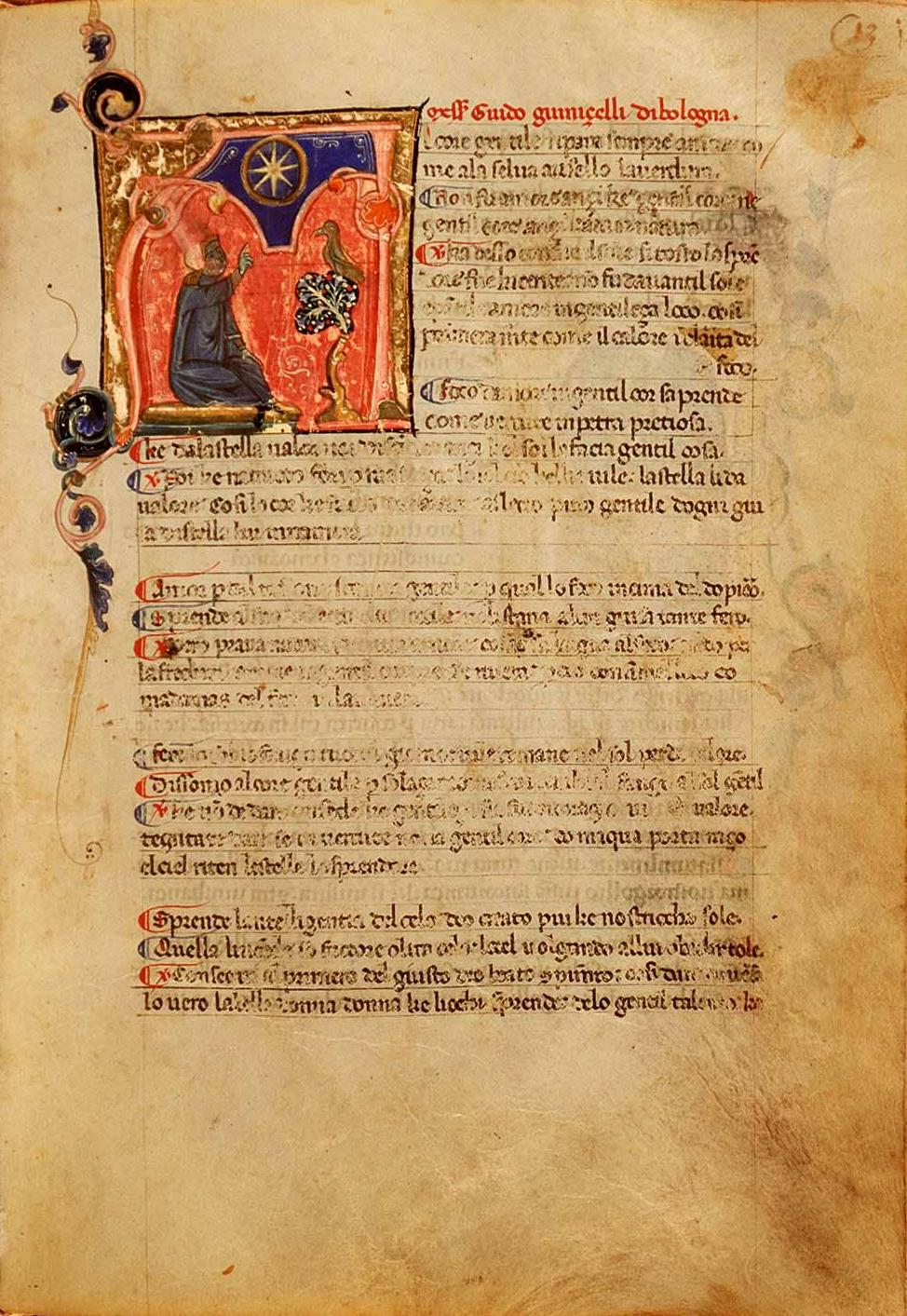
Manuscript copy of Guinizzelli's most famous poem, Al cor gentil rempaira sempre amore

Guido Guinizelli (c. 1225 – 1276) was an Italian love poet and is considered the "father" of the Dolce Stil Novo. He was the first to write in this new style of poetry writing, and thus is held to be the ipso facto founder. He was born in, and later exiled from, Bologna, Italy. It is speculated that he died in Verona, Italy.

== Life ==
His precise identity is uncertain, but he may have been Guido di Guinizello di Magnano, exiled from Bologna with the Lambertazzi Ghibellines in 1274 and dying in Monselice about two years later. He corresponded with Guittone d'Arezzo, whom he respectfully addressed as ‘caro padre meo’ and by whom he was called in return ‘figlio dilettoso’. Assuming the sonnet in question is indeed addressed to him, he was later accused by Guittone of the ‘laido errore’ of wishing to praise his lady using ideas and terms from natural philosophy. Bonagiunta Orbicciani also charged him with making love poetry obscure through his philosophical importations. But these were the very reasons for which Dante admired him, and increasingly so as time went by.

== Poetry ==
We have five canzoni and fifteen sonnets which are definitely his, plus fragments of two other poems. Guinizelli's poetry can be briefly described as a conciliation between divine and earthly love with deep psychological introspection. His major works are Al cor gentil rempaira sempre Amore (Within the gentle heart abideth Love), which Peter Dronke considers "perhaps the most influential love-song of the thirteenth century", as well as Io vogli[o] del ver la mia donna laudare and Vedut'ho la lucente stella Diana.

Al cor gentil rempaira sempre amore insists on the unity of noble love and true ‘gentilesse’:

Within the gentle heart love shelters him,
As birds within the green shade of the grove.
Before the gentle heart, in Nature's scheme,
Love was not, nor the gentle heart ere love

— Translation by Dante Gabriel Rossetti

This, and the way in which Guido combined passion and intellect to create a philosophical poetry of love, profoundly impressed Dante, who quotes and echoes the canzone several times. The main themes of the Dolce Stil Novo can be found in Guinizelli's poem: the angelic beauty of the beloved women, the comparison of nobility to the sun and the rampant use of topoi such as cor gentil and Amore. Geoffrey Chaucer's lines in Troilus and Criseyde ‘Plesance of love, O goodly debonaire, | In gentil hertes ay redy to repaire’ (III.4–5) seem to be a clear echo of the poem's opening.

The sonnets too display motifs which will reappear in Cavalcanti and Dante, such as the lady's salvific greeting (‘saluto’), the use of natural imagery to praise her (recalling the Song of Songs), and the idea of love as a passion that carries all before it, though a poem such as ‘Vedut'ho la lucente stella diana’ actually fuses together new and old styles.

== Role in Dante's Divine Comedy ==
=== Purgatorio XI ===
Guido Guinizelli appears twice in Dante Alighieri's Purgatorio. At first, he is briefly mentioned in Purgatorio XI, when Dante encounters the great Italian artist, Oderisi da Gubbio, on the terrace of Pride. While discussing the fleeting nature of fame and recognition, Oderisi refers to Guido Guinizelli and his successor, Guido Cavalcanti (ca. 1250–1300):

Thus has one Guido taken from the other
the glory of our tongue, and he, perhaps, is born
who will drive one and then the other from the nest.

— Purgatorio XI. 97-99

=== Purgatorio XXVI ===
In Purgatorio XXVI, Dante journeys through the terrace of Lust, where he finally meets Guido Guinizelli. Like the other shades on this terrace, Guido is engulfed in flames to repent for his burning desires while alive. Once Guido reveals his identity, Dante narrates the awe and respect he has for the poet:

when he gave his name and I knew he had been
father to me and to others, my betters,
who always used love's sweet and graceful rhymes

— Purgatorio XXVI. 97-99

In this tercet, Dante refers to Guinizelli's influence on Italian poetry and the style of Dolce Stil Novo.

== Bibliography ==
- Gorni, G. (2002). "Guinizelli, Guido". The Oxford Companion to Chaucer. Oxford: Oxford University Press.
- "Guinizelli, Guido". The Oxford Companion to Chaucer. Oxford: Oxford University Press. 2003.
