= Cino da Pistoia =

Italian jurist and poet (1270 – c. 1336)

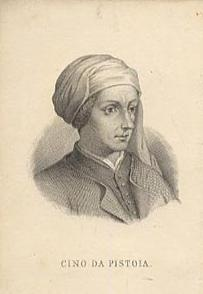
- Cino da Pistoia, 19th-century engraving
- Born: Guittoncino de' Sinibuldi; 15 April 1270; Pistoia
- Died: 24 December 1336 (aged 66); Pistoia
- Resting place: Pistoia Cathedral
- Education: University of Bologna
- Occupations: jurist; poet
- Spouse: Margherita di Lanfranco degli Ughi (after 1302)
- Children: Mino; Diamante; Giovanna; Lombarduccia; Beatrice
- Parent(s): Francesco di Guittoncino di Sigisbuldo (father); Diamante di Bonaventura di Tonello (mother)
- Writing career
- Language: Italian (Tuscan dialect); Latin
- Period: Late Middle Ages
- Genres: Poetry (sonnet; canzone; ballata); Prose (treatise; epistle; correspondence)
- Movement: Dolce Stil Novo

Cino da Pistoia (1270 – 1336) was an Italian jurist and poet. He was the university teacher of Bartolus de Saxoferrato and a friend and intellectual influence on Dante Alighieri.

== Life ==
Cino was born in Pistoia, Tuscany. His full name was Guittoncino dei Sinibaldi or, Latinised, Cinus de Sighibuldis. His father was a nobleman from the House of Sinibaldi.

Exiled from Pistoia in 1302, he was able (unlike Dante) to return to his native city after a few years and hold public office. He supported the Emperor Henry VII, and composed a canzone on his death in 1313.

Cino received his doctorate in law from the University of Bologna, where he studied under Dinus de Rossonis. From 1321 he was a professor of law, teaching in Siena, Florence and Perugia and also in Naples when the young Boccaccio was there. Two of his students were Bartolus (in Perugia) and Francesco Petrarca (in Bologna).

In 1334, he was elected Gonfaloniere of Pistoia, but did not take up the office. Cino is buried in the Cathedral of Saint Zeno in Pistoia.

== Works ==
Cino's works as Latin jurist include a Lectura in Codicem and an unfinished Lectura in Digestum vetus. The Lectura in Codicem (1312–1314), his most important legal work, was a commentary on the Justinian Code which blended pure Roman law with contemporary statutes and customary and canon law, thereby initiating Italian common law.

In Italian, Cino is the most prolific writer of lyric poetry between Guittone d'Arezzo and Petrarch, with a secure surviving corpus of twenty canzoni, eleven ballate and 134 sonnets, notable for purity of language and harmony of rhythms. Most of these are love-poems celebrating Selvaggia dei Vergiolesi (d.1310). In the De vulgari eloquentia (2.2) Dante assigns him prime place amongst love poets in Italian.

His friendship with Dante appears to have been a long-standing one, although it may be that Terino da Castelfiorentino, not Cino (as has been thought), was the author of one of the replies to Dante’s early ‘A ciascun alma presa e gentil core’ (Vita Nova 3). Cino composed a canzone on the death of Beatrice in 1290, and there are another six sonnets to Dante from Cino and five by Dante to Cino, with Dante initiating the exchange in two cases. They seem to have been particularly close during the first years of Dante’s exile. In the De vulgari eloquentia Dante links the two of them in his poetic rolls of honour as ‘Cynus et amicus eius’. He also addresses the third of his letters (1306?) ‘to the Pistoian exile’. On the death of Dante in 1321 Cino wrote the celebratory ‘Su per la costa, Amor, de l’alto monte’. There are, however, two sonnets (one of which is not definitely by Cino) which are critical of the Divine Comedy.

Cino is the link between the Dolce Stil Novo and the greater lyric poetry of Petrarch, whose musicality his own practice anticipates. His poetic correspondents include Guido Cavalcanti and Onesto da Bologna, who jibed at the dreaminess of the Dolce Stil Novo. Cino was also close to his fellow student Giovanni d'Andrea. The opening of the canzone, ‘La dolce vista e’l bel guardo soave’, is cited respectfully by Petrarch (Canz. 70) and the whole poem is re-written in ottava rima in Boccaccio’s Filocolo (5.62–5). Petrarch also wrote a sonnet on his death (Canz. 92).

== Portrayals ==
Cino is the narrator of Ezra Pound's dramatic monologue "Cino."

== Works ==
- Lectura in Codicem (in Latin). Lugduni: [Compagnie des Libraires de Lyon]. 1547.
- Le rime (in Italian). Milano: Istituto Editoriale Italiano. n.d.
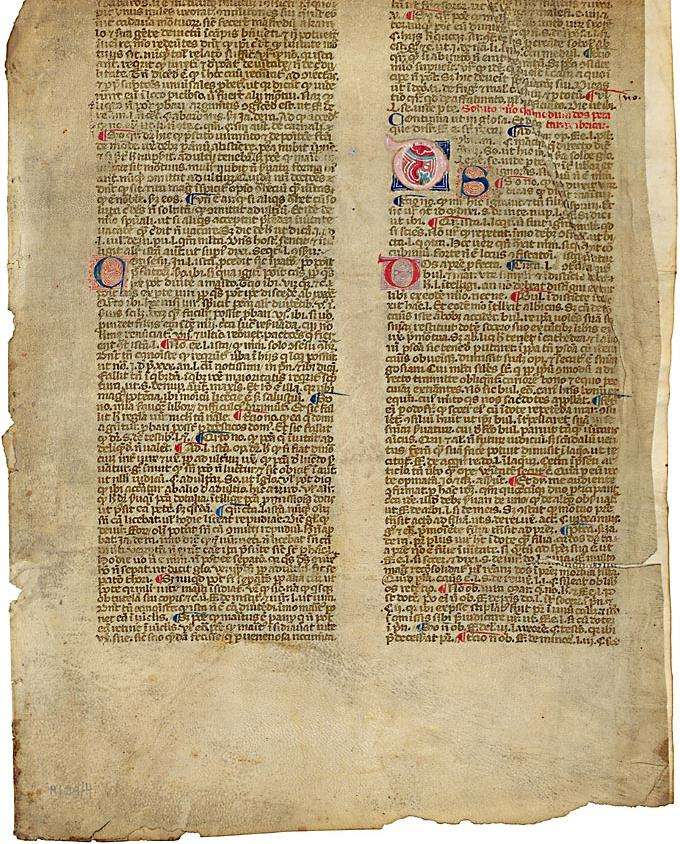
Lectura in Codicem, Schøyen Collection (Norway), MS 209/04, Italian provenance, 1st half of 14th century

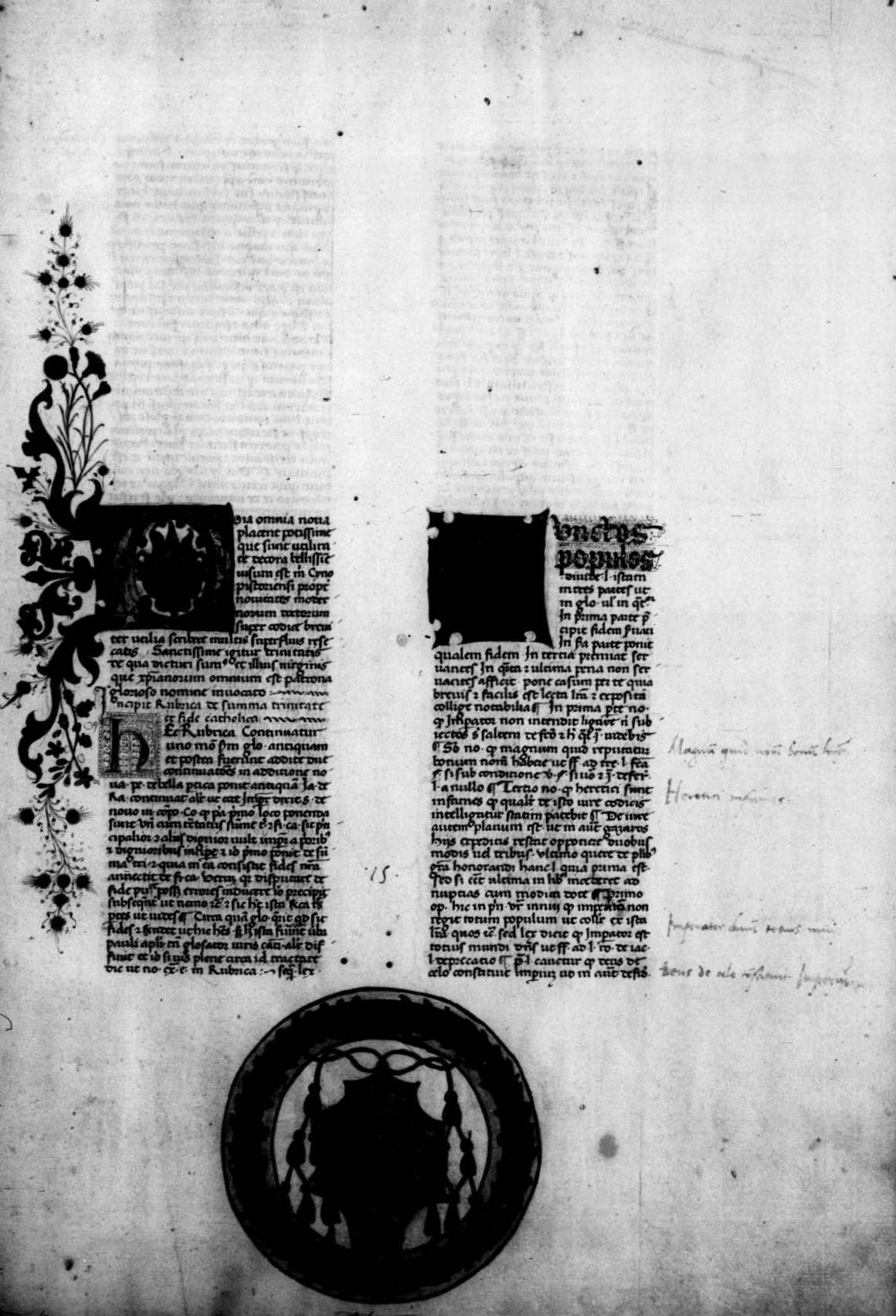
Lectura Codicis (C. 1.1-5.37.25; 5.42.1-5.43.9; 5.37.28.2-4.42), Lectura Digesti veteris (D. 12.1.1-12.1.42), XV century manuscript.

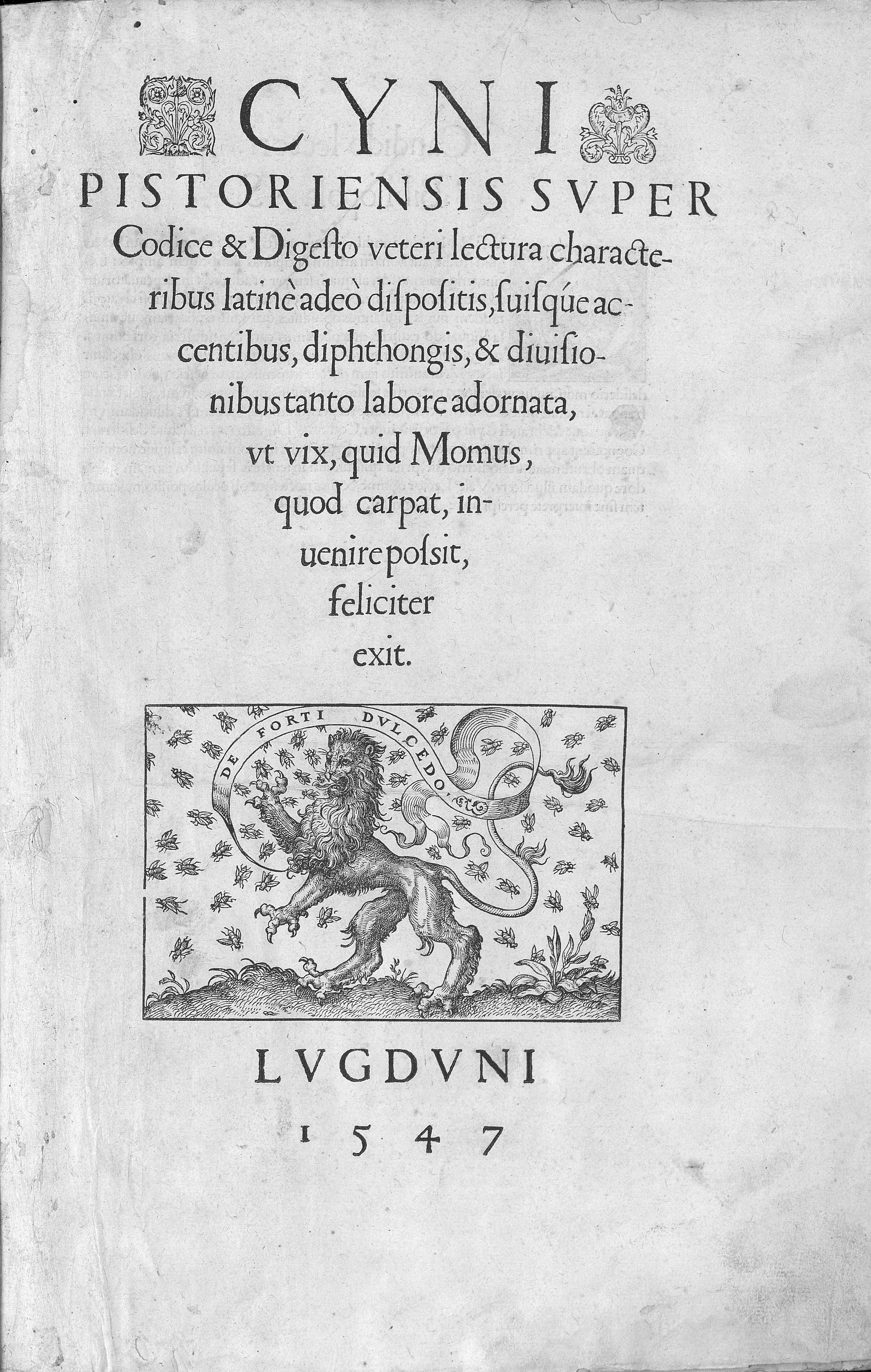
Lectura in Codicem, 1547

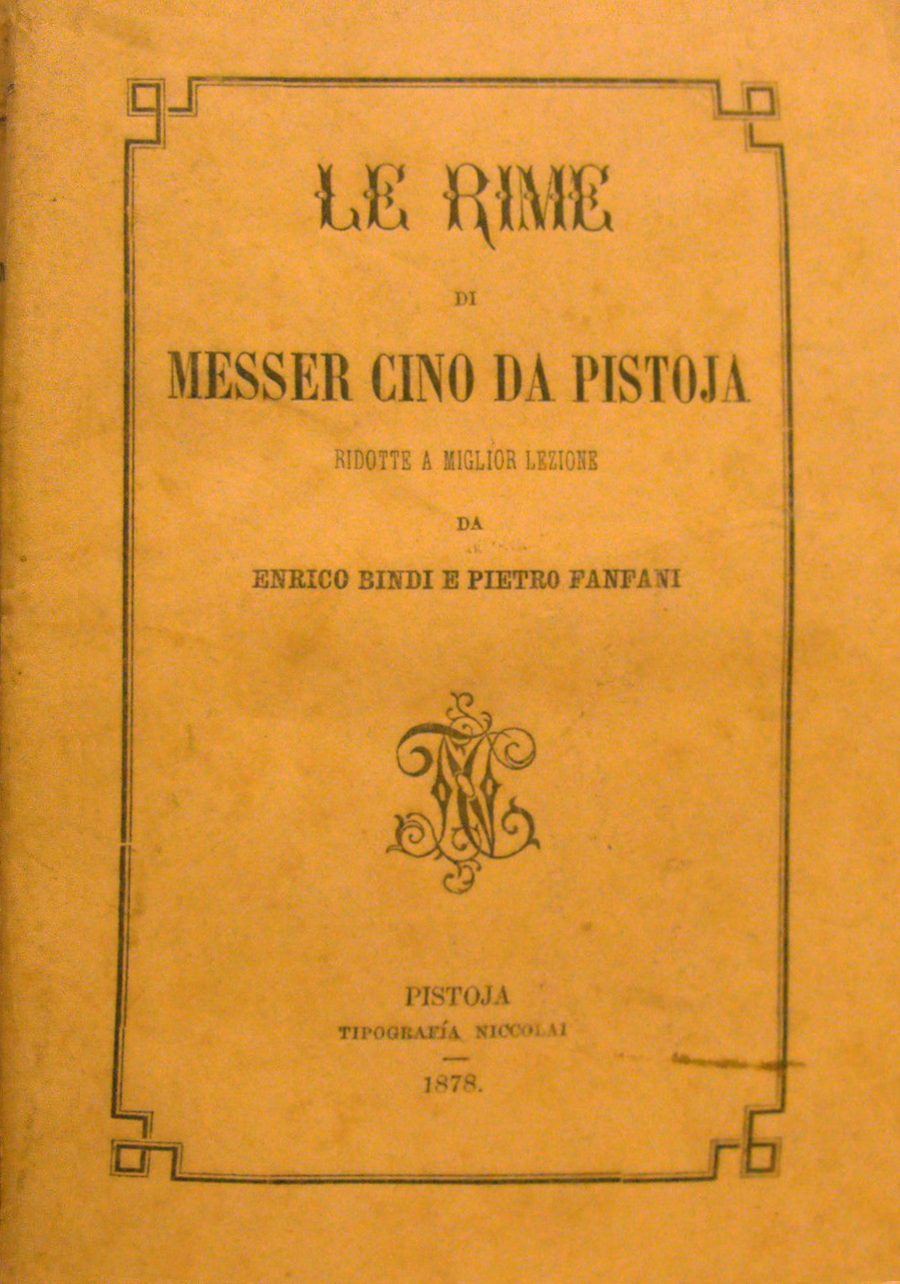
Le rime, 1878

== Sources ==
- Boggs, Edward L. (1979). "Cino and Petrarch". MLN. 94 (1): 146–52. doi:10.2307/2906335. JSTOR 2906335.
- Hollander, Robert (1992). "Dante and Cino da Pistoia". Dante Studies, with the Annual Report of the Dante Society (110): 201–231. JSTOR 40166458.
- Took, John (2000). "Cino da Pistoia and the Poetics of Sweet Subversion". In Prue Shaw; John Took (eds.). Reflexivity: critical themes in the Italian cultural tradition. Ravenna: Longo. pp. 1–19. doi:10.1400/43522.
- Weimar, Peter (2001). "Cino da Pistoia". In Michael Stolleis (ed.). Juristen: ein biographisches Lexikon; von der Antike bis zum 20. Jahrhundert (in German) (2nd ed.). München: Beck. p. 133. ISBN 3-406-45957-9.
- Keen, Catherine M. (2002). "Cino da Pistoia and the Otherness of Exile". Annali d'Italianistica. 20: 89–112. JSTOR 24009756.
- Cappi, Davide (2013). "Emendazioni alla vulgata dei sonetti di Cino da Pistoia". Medioevo letterario d'Italia: Rivista internazionale di filologia, linguistica e letteratura. 10 (10): 31–70. doi:10.1400/216331.
- Leuker, Tobias (2014). "La «selvaggia gente […] crudel di se stessa e dispietata». Pensiero politico e lessico amoroso in una ballata di Cino da Pistoia". Lettere Italiane. 66 (2): 242–48. JSTOR 26240842.
- Carrai, Stefano; Maffei, Paola (2018). "SINIBULDI, Cino". Dizionario Biografico degli Italiani (in Italian). Vol. 92: Semino–Sisto IV. Rome: Institute of the Italian Encyclopaedia. ISBN 978-88-12-00032-6.
- Ferrilli, Sara (2019). "Cino da Pistoia, Francesco da Barberino e l'astrologia giudiziaria: tra poesia, politica e cultura giuridica". In Franziska Meier; Enrica Zanin (eds.). Poesia e diritto nel Due e Trecento italiano. Ravenna: Longo editore. pp. 105–124. doi:10.1400/278672. ISBN 978-88-9350-033-3.
