= Guittone d'Arezzo =

Italian poet (1235–1294)

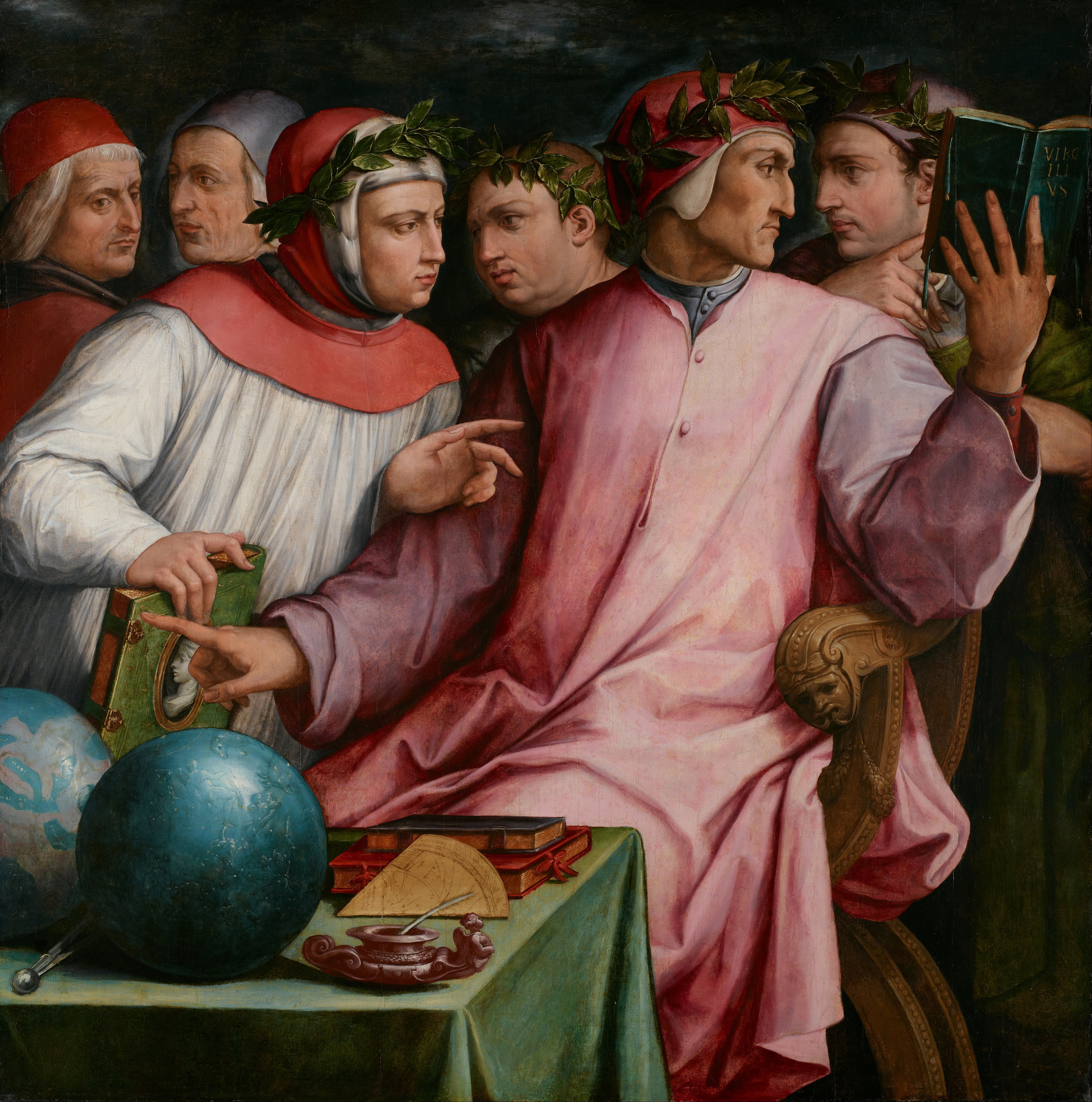
- Giorgio Vasari, Six Tuscan Poets (c. 1544); left to right: Guittone, Cino da Pistoia, Petrarch, Giovanni Boccaccio, Dante Alighieri and Guido Cavalcanti. Oil on panel, 132.8 × 131.1 cm (52.2 × 51.6 in). Minneapolis Institute of Art, Minnesota
- Born: c. 1235; Arezzo
- Died: 21 August 1294 (aged 58–59); Florence
- Occupations: knight; poet
- Parent: Viva di Michele (father)
- Writing career
- Language: Italian (Tuscan dialect)
- Period: High Middle Ages
- Genres: Poetry (sonnet; canzone; ballata); Prose (treatise; epistle; correspondence)
- Movement: Tuscan School

Guittone d'Arezzo (Arezzo, c. 1235 – 21 August 1294) was a Tuscan poet and the founder of the Tuscan School. He was an acclaimed secular love poet before his conversion in the 1260s, when he became a religious poet joining the Order of the Blessed Virgin Mary. In 1256, he was exiled from Arezzo due to his Guelph sympathies.

== Biography ==
Son of Viva di Michele and chamberlain of his area, he travelled often for business. A passionate supporter of the Guelfs, he lamented in a celebrated canzone the Ghibelline victory of Montaperti (1260). Guittone had a wife and three children who he would later abandon in 1256 after a spiritual crisis. He joined the Order of the Knights of the Blessed Virgin Mary, a relatively exclusive group permitting members on the basis of financial background, showing Guittone's aristocratic familial origin and wealth. The group's primary goal was to favor and promote the peace between the Guelf and Ghibelline factions. Guittone died in Florence on 21 August 1294. He willed his estate to build the Camaldolese monastery of Santa Maria degli Angeli, near Florence.

== Works ==
His surviving work comprises forty letters and some 300 poems, these dividing evenly between about 140 courtly poems (c. 1250–c. 1263), and the moral writing, in verse and prose, that accompanied and followed his conversion (c. 1265). The entire corpus is unified by his inherent sobriety, didactic sententiousness, and stylistic virtuosity. A conflict between the inherited Romance tradition and his learned civic formation and logical, moral temper is already apparent in the 120 courtly sonnets, most of which he links, for the first time in the history of the sonnet, into cycles (five in all, three of them narrative), to probe the moral inconsistencies of the conventional love ethos. The 20 courtly canzoni display a pioneering grasp of the difficult style of the Provençal troubadours (trobar clus).

Following his religious awakening, the tone and subject of Guittone's poems shifted. He started to sign his works as Fra Guittone, and in the canzone "Ora parrà s'eo saverò cantare" he refers to his previous love poems as foolish. A series of palinodes announce a muscular new assertion of the moral will, abandoning Love and embracing Christian ethics. They introduce a body of mature work, much of it in correspondence form, in which he preached an austere code of practical civic conduct to all ranks of contemporary central Italian society. This blunt and sober writing of his maturity is marked by formal inventiveness. His epistles in the vernacular display high mastery of ars dictaminis, coupled with stylistic experimentation. The letters, without precedent in Italian, furnish an anthology of models for sermons and political speeches. He invented the double sonnet and perfected the lauda-ballata; he addressed the communes of Arezzo, Pisa, and Florence, and leading political figures like Nino Visconti and Corso Donati; and his exchanges with poets like Chiaro Davanzati, Guido Guinizzelli, and Guido Cavalcanti point to a looming crisis of allegiances and styles in which Guittone's prosaic moralizing and dense style were to be the anti-model of the Tuscan lyric avant-garde.

== Legacy ==
Guittone was the most considerable figure among the transitional Tuscan poets who followed the Sicilians and preceded the stil novo. He was the first poetic voice of the communes and the first Italian poet to write on moral and political themes in the high lyric style. All his work has the stamp of an original and powerful mind. His important Canzoniere contains earlier poems on the conventional love themes of Sicily and Provence, and later ones on ascetic religious subjects. The manner of his canzoni and sonnets remains constant, however, in its cultivation of all the artifice and deliberate obscurity of expression inherent in the Provençal tradition of the trobar clus. It was against Guittone that the polemic of Dante and the Stilnovists was largely directed on the grounds of his harshness, obscurity and extravagant artificiality. But though often graceless, his verse does achieve more solid meaning and a firmer contact with life than the rather fragile poetic tradition of his Sicilian predecessors. In spite of recent reappraisals his work is still struggling to recover from Dante's brief but deadly dismissals (De vulgari eloquentia 1, xiii, 1 and II, vi, 8; Purg. XXIV, 56 and XXVI, 124-6).

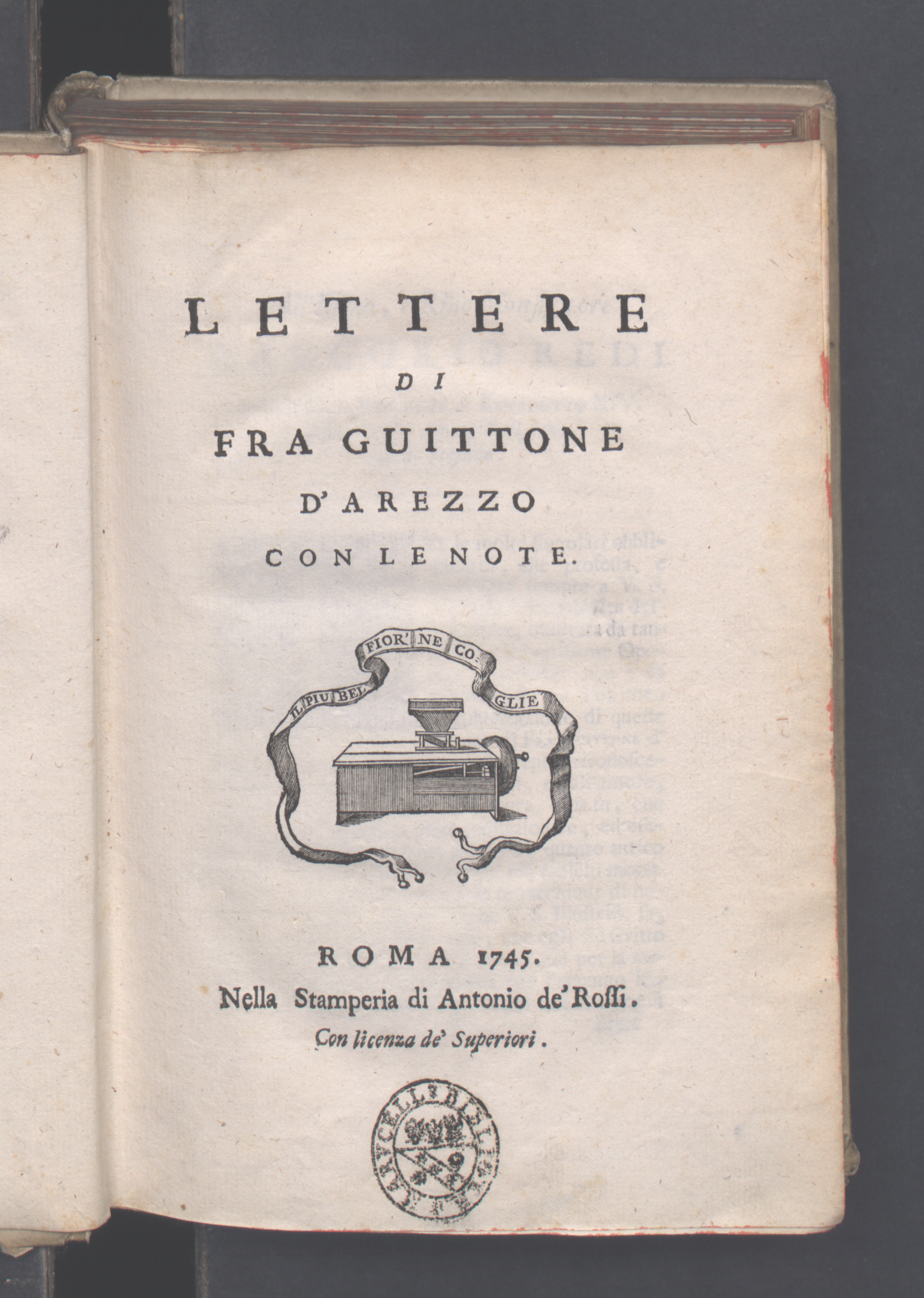
Lettere di Fra Guittone d'Arezzo, 1745 edition

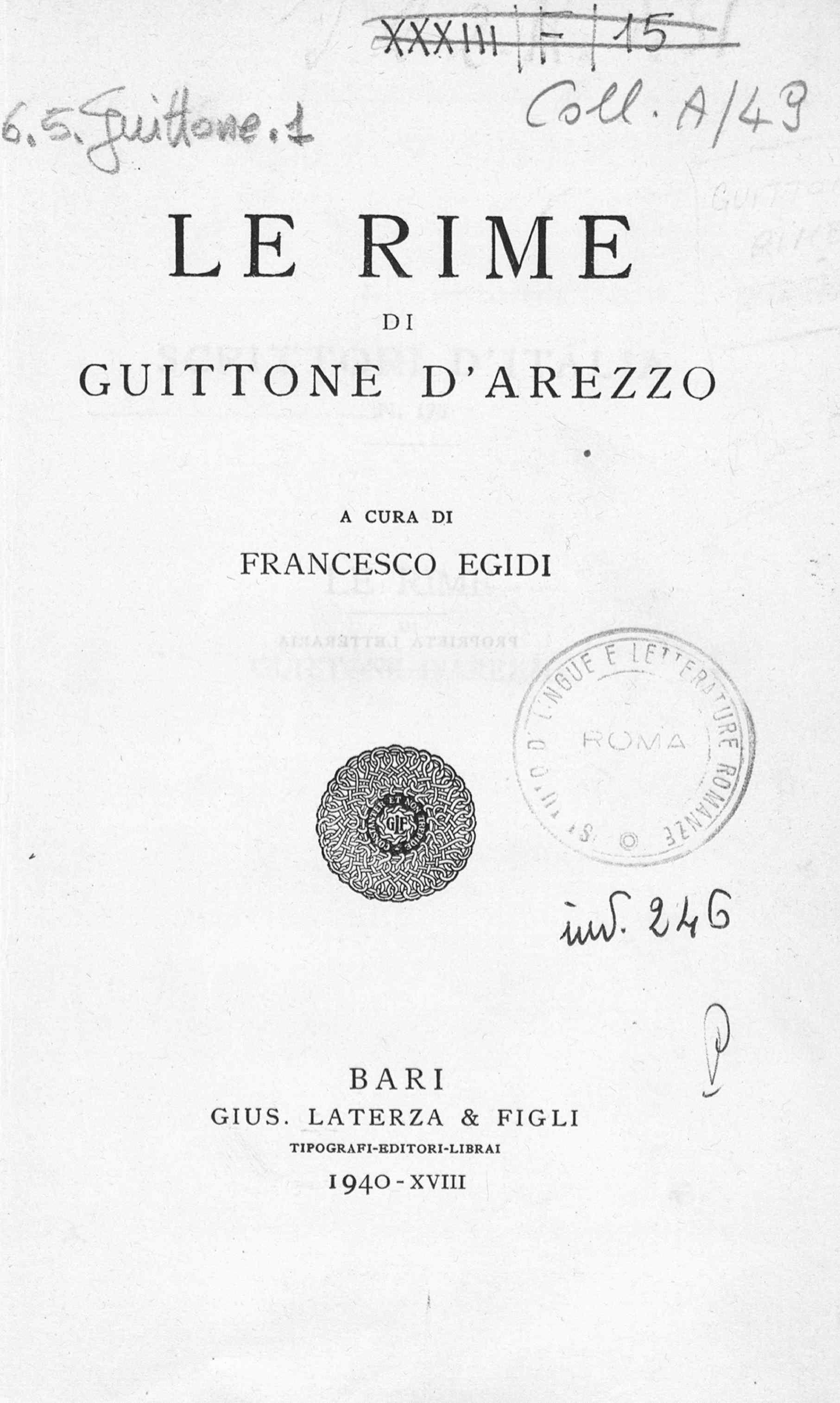
Rime, 1940 edition

== Bibliography ==
- Pellizzari, Achille (1906). La vita e le opere di Guittone d'Arezzo. Pisa: Tip. Successori Fratelli Nistri.
- Torraca, Francesco (1923). "Fra Guittone". Studi di storia letteraria. Florence: 108–152.
- Marti, Mario (1970). "Guittone d'Arezzo e i guittoniani". Enciclopedia Dantesca. Rome: Istituto dell'Enciclopedia Italiana.
- Cherchi, Paolo (1995). "Omaggio a Guittone (1294-1994)". Italica. 72 (2): 125–142. doi:10.2307/480155. JSTOR 480155.
- Lino Pertile; Peter Brand, eds. (1999). The Cambridge History of Italian Literature. Cambridge: Cambridge University Press. pp. 15–7. ISBN 978-0521666220.
- Moleta, Vincenzo (2002). "Guittone d'Arezzo". The Oxford Companion to Italian Literature. Oxford: Oxford University Press.
- Stoppino, Eleonora (2010). "Guittone d'Arezzo". The Oxford Dictionary of the Middle Ages. Oxford: Oxford University Press.
- Borsa, Paolo (2018). "'Scuro saccio che par lo / meo detto' (I Know that my Word Seems Obscure): Wordplay and Obscurity in Thirteenth-Century Italian Poetry". In Mikael Males (ed.). Etymology and Wordplay in Medieval Literature. Disputatio. Vol. 30. Turnhout: Brepols Publishers. pp. 137–168. doi:10.1484/M.DISPUT-EB.5.115600. ISBN 978-2-503-57575-9.
