= Dolce Stil Novo =

Medieval Italian literary movement

Dolce Stil Novo (Italian pronunciation: [ˈdoltʃe ˌstil ˈnɔːvo], 'sweet new style') was a literary movement in 13th and 14th century Italy. Influenced by the Sicilian School and Tuscan poetry, its main theme is Divine Love. The name Dolce Stil Novo was used for the first time by Dante Alighieri in Purgatorio, the second canticle of the Divina Commedia. In the Divina Commedia Purgatory he meets Bonagiunta Orbicciani, a 13th-century Italian poet, who tells Dante that Dante himself, Guido Guinizelli, and Guido Cavalcanti had been able to create a new genre: a stil novo.

Poetry from this school is marked by adoration of the human form, incorporating vivid descriptions of female beauty and frequently comparing the desired woman to a creature from paradise. The woman is described as an "angel" or as "a bridge to God". Rather than being material in nature, the Love of the Dolce Stil Novo is a sort of Divine Love. Poetry of this movement also often includes profound introspection. Many literary critics have argued that introspection in Italian literary works was first introduced by the Stil Novo poets, and later developed by Francesco Petrarca. The two main concepts (introspection and love) are thus brought together as the poet enters his interior world to express his most inner feelings, which are caused by an excessively divine female beauty. The first expression of this style of writing is credited to Guido Guinizelli and his poem "Al cor gentil rempaira sempre amore". Precursors to the dolce stil novo are found in the Provençal works of the troubadours, such as the Genoese Lanfranc Cigala. The artists of the stil novo are called stilnovisti.

The importance of the Dolce Stil Novo lies in the fact that apart from being the manifestation of the first true literary tradition in Italy, it ennobled the Tuscan vernacular, which was destined to become the Italian national language.

== In Dante's Purgatorio ==
In Dante Alighieri's Purgatorio XXIV, on the sixth terrace of Purgatory, the poet and glutton Bonagiunta Orbicciani, after confirming that Dante is the poet who wrote "Ladies that have intelligence of love", a poem from Vita Nuova, uses the phrase dolce stil novo ("sweet new style", mentioned for the first time in the Italian vernacular) to describe Dante's style as a poet, and how it marked a shift from the styles of poets that came before him like of Giacomo da Lentini and Guittone d'Arezzo.

Dante scholars have tried to define this "sweet new style", and it remains a source of much contention. Dante, the character, claims "I am one who, when Love inspires me, takes note, and, as he dictates within me, so I set it forth" (Purg. XXIV, 52–54). What "Love" means in this tercet has divided many Dante scholars, who question whether it is Amore, the god of Love, or whether it is another name for the Christian God. Robert Hollander hypothesizes that the phrase can be understood in theological terms. By using Bonagiunta to describe his style as dolce stil novo, Dante is presenting himself as more than just a usual love poet because of the theological significance of Beatrice. Beatrice embodies God's love for him, and she, who also acts as his guide, can lead to God. Hollander and Furio Brugnolo also argue that Cino da Pistoia, whom Dante believed was the only one who understood this significance of Beatrice, also falls in this "school" of poetry.

Dante scholar Zygmunt G. Barański states that the definition of the phrase should not be searched for externally as it can be found in the text of the poem itself: it is a style where form and content are in harmony, and this harmony is what makes the style "sweet." Another word for dulcis is clarity, and Dante himself believed that for poetry to be sweet, it should be as intelligible as possible.

In the nineteenth century, scholars began considering and studying dolce stil novo as a "school" of poetry. Scholars, to differentiate Dante's use of the term to Purgatorio to the literary movement, called the movement stil nuovo.
