= Canzone =

Italian or Provençal song or ballad

Literally 'song' in Italian, a canzone (Italian: [kanˈtsoːne]; pl.: canzoni; cognate with English to chant) is an Italian or Provençal song or ballad. It is also used to describe a type of lyric which resembles a madrigal. Sometimes a composition which is simple and songlike is designated as a canzone, especially if it is by a non-Italian; a good example is the aria "Voi che sapete" from Mozart's Marriage of Figaro.

The term canzone is also used interchangeably with canzona, an important Italian instrumental form of the late 16th and early 17th century. Often works designated as such are canzoni da sonar; these pieces are an important precursor to the sonata. Terminology was lax in the late Renaissance and early Baroque music periods, and what one composer might call "canzoni da sonar" might be termed "canzona" by another, or even "fantasia".

Derived from the Provençal canso, the very lyrical and original Italian canzone consists of 5 to 7 stanzas typically set to music, each stanza resounding the first in rhyme scheme and in number of lines (7 to 20 lines). The canzone is typically hendecasyllabic (11 syllables). The congedo or commiato also forms the pattern of the Provençal tornado, known as the French envoi, addressing the poem itself or directing it to the mission of a character, originally a personage. Originally delivered at the Sicilian court of Emperor Frederick II during the 13th century of the Middle Ages, the lyrical form was later commanded by Dante, Petrarch, Boccaccio, and leading Renaissance writers such as Spenser (the marriage hymn in his Epithalamion).

== Minnesang ==
The canzone (German: Kanzone) is the characteristic strophic form of Minnesang, the Middle High German lyric genre. In Minnesang, the canzone follows the tri-partite structure of the Provençal canso: two metrically identical Stollen ("supports") form the Aufgesang (literally "up-song"), which is followed by a metrically distinct Abgesang ("down-song"). The following rules generally apply:

- each line in the first Stollen rhymes with the matching line in the second
- the Abgesang introduces new rhymes and may contain a non-rhyming line
- the Abgesang is longer than a single Stollen but shorter than the entire Aufgesang.

Hartman von Aue, Crusading Song (MF 211,20)
| Aufgesang | 1st Stollen | Swẹlch vrouwe sẹndet lieben man | a | Any lady who sends her beloved man |
| Aufgesang | 1st Stollen | mit rëhtem muote ûf dise vart, | b | In the right spirit on this journey |
| Aufgesang | 2nd Stollen | diu koufet halben lôn daran, | a | Thereby gains half of the reward |
| Aufgesang | 2nd Stollen | ob si sich heime alsô bewart, | b | If she conducts herself at home |
| Abgesang | | daȥ si verdienet kiuschiu wort, | c | So as to gain a chaste reputation |
| Abgesang | | sî bëte für si beidiu hie, | x | She prays for both of them here |
| Abgesang | | so vẹrt ër für sî beidiu dort. | c | He travels for both of them there |

This basic pattern is typical of early Minnesang. As the genre develops, more complex forms are found. For example, one of Neithart's Winter Songs, "Winder, dîniu meil" (No. 32), has a 14-line canzone with the rhyme scheme a b c d | a b c d || e e f g f g.

The earliest canzone in Minnesang date from the late 12th Century and are part of the more general influence of the Romance lyric.

== See also ==
- Chanson – a genre named after the equivalent French word
