= Purgatorio =

Second part of Dante's Divine Comedy

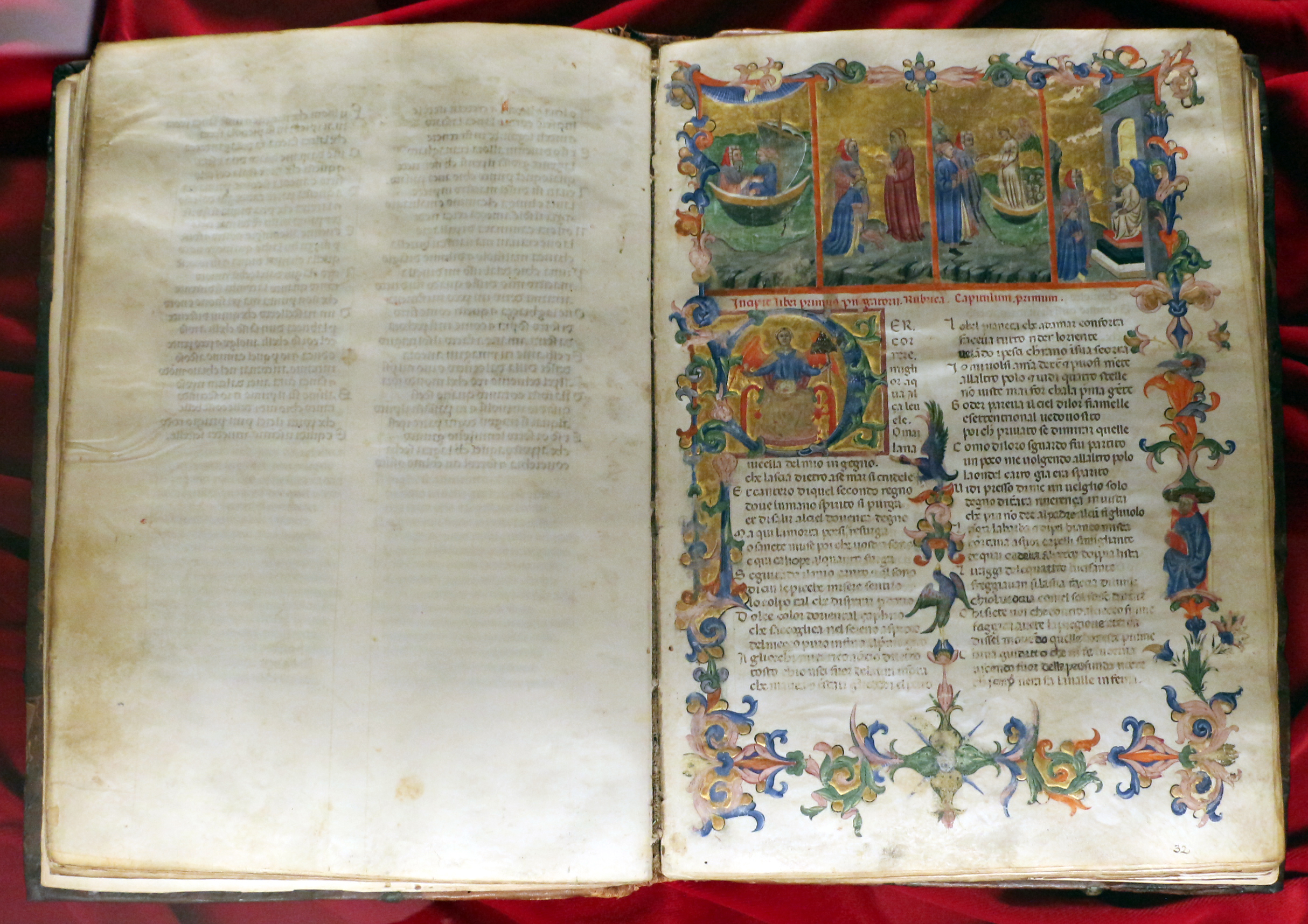
- A page of the Purgatorio at the Laurentian Library
- Author: Dante Alighieri
- Language: Italian
- Series: Divine Comedy
- Genre: narrative poem
- Publication date: c. 1321
- Publication place: Italy
- Text: Purgatorio at Wikisource

Purgatorio (Italian: [purɡaˈtɔːrjo]; Italian for "Purgatory") is the second part of Dante's Divine Comedy, following the Inferno and preceding the Paradiso; it was written in the early 14th century. It is an allegorical telling of the climb of Dante up the Mount of Purgatory, guided by the Roman poet Virgil—except for the last four cantos, at which point Beatrice takes over as Dante's guide. Allegorically, Purgatorio represents the penitent Christian life. In describing the climb Dante discusses the nature of sin, examples of vice and virtue, as well as moral issues in politics and in the Church. The poem posits the theory that all sins arise from love—either perverted love directed towards others' harm, or deficient love, or the disordered or excessive love of good things.

== Overview of Purgatory ==
Elevation of Mount Purgatory. As with Paradise, the structure is of the form 2 + 7 + 1 = 10, with one of the ten regions different in nature from the other nine.

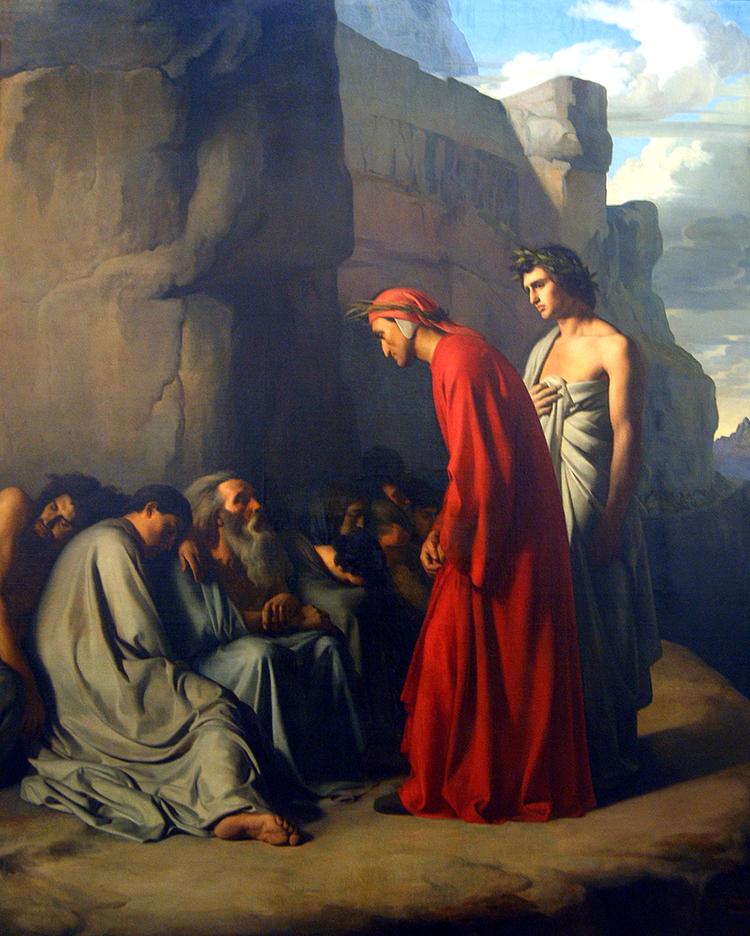
Le Dante, conduit par Virgile, offre des consolations aux âmes des Envieux by Hippolyte Flandrin

Dante portrays Purgatory as an island-mountain in the Southern Hemisphere. This realm is divided into three parts. The bottom slopes of Mount Purgatory (Purgatorio I–IX) have been designated as "Ante-Purgatory" by commentators. Purgatory proper consists of seven levels or terraces (Purgatorio X–XXVII) of suffering and spiritual growth, associated with the seven deadly sins. Finally, the Earthly Paradise is located at the top of the mountain (Purgatorio XXVIII–XXXIII).

=== Passage of time ===
As described in the Inferno, the first twenty-four hours of Dante's journey took place on earth and started on the evening of Maundy Thursday, 24 March (or 7 April) 1300 (Inf. I and II), and the next full day (Good Friday) was spent exploring the depths of Hell with Virgil as a guide (Inf. III–XXXIV.69). Dante and Virgil spent the next day ascending from Hell to see the stars (Inf. XXXIV.70–139). They arrive at the shore of the Mountain of Purgatory—the only land in the Southern Hemisphere—at 6 am on Easter Sunday, which is 6 pm on Sunday in Jerusalem, since the two points are antipodal. Dante describes Hell as existing underneath Jerusalem, having been created by the impact of Lucifer's fall; the Mountain of Purgatory was created by a displacement of rock caused by the same event. The Purgatorio picks up where the Inferno left off, describing Dante's three-and-one-quarter-day trip up the mountain that ends with Dante in the Earthly Paradise at the time of noon on Wednesday, 30 March (or 13 April).

=== Prayer ===
Prayer is a dominant theme in Purgatorio. Many of the souls Dante meets are depicted in prayer, with multiple liturgical references to psalms and hymns throughout the terraces. Prayers by the living on behalf of the souls also play a large role in the cantica, with some souls the pilgrim meets along the way requesting prayers from living relatives and even from the pilgrim himself. Dante learns from Manfred of Sicily in Ante-Purgatory that, in Purgatory, prayers from others work by shortening the wait that souls have to endure before entering Purgatory proper and by accelerating the rate at which souls ascend Mount Purgatory. One soul, Forese Donati, has gotten through Ante-Purgatory and the majority of the terraces only five years after his death, because of the prayers of his wife, Nella, on Earth. Forese's case, especially when compared to that of Statius, who has spent over 500 years on Mount Purgatory, shows the power of prayer to aid souls after death. Dante receives eleven distinct requests for prayer from individual souls in Purgatory, with most of the requests coming from souls in Ante-Purgatory and with the frequency of requests decreasing as he progresses through Purgatory.

== Ante-Purgatory ==
Ante-Purgatory is the region below the entrance into Purgatory proper and houses two main categories of souls whose penitent Christian life was delayed or deficient: the excommunicate and the late-repentant. This transitional space parallels similar sections found in the Inferno (the space reserved for the lukewarm and the neutral angels found in Inferno III) and in the Paradiso (the heavens under the shadow of Earth traversed by the pilgrim in Paradiso I–IX).

This region is therefore characterised by a lingering attachment to earthly life and affairs, so that the crowds of souls whom Dante and Virgil meet here all marvel at Dante's body in the flesh (Purgatorio II–III). As Statius will later explain, Ante-Purgatory is also the only area of Mount Purgatory that is subjected to terrestrial meteorology.

=== Shore of the island (Cantos I–II) ===
In Purgatorio I.4–9, with the sun rising on Easter Sunday, Dante announces his intention to describe Purgatory by invoking the mythical Muses, as he did in Canto II of the Inferno:

Now I shall sing the second kingdom
there where the soul of man is cleansed,
made worthy to ascend to Heaven.

Here from the dead let poetry rise up,
O sacred Muses, since I am yours.
Here let Calliope arise...

At the shores of Purgatory, Dante and Virgil meet Cato, a pagan who was placed by God as the general guardian of the approach to the mountain (his symbolic significance has been much debated). The Purgatorio demonstrates the medieval knowledge of a spherical Earth, with Dante referencing the different stars visible in the Southern Hemisphere, the altered position of the sun, and the various time zones of the Earth. For instance, at the start of Canto II, the reader learns that it is dawn in Purgatory; Dante conveys this concept by explaining that it is sunset at Jerusalem (antipodal to the Mount of Purgatory), midnight (six hours later) over India on the River Ganges (with the constellation Libra overhead there), and noon (six hours earlier) over Spain. The journey is conceived as taking place during the vernal equinox, when the days and nights are of the same length.

By now the sun was crossing the horizon
of the meridian whose highest point
covers Jerusalem; and from the Ganges,

night, circling opposite the sun, was moving
together with the Scales that, when the length
of dark defeats the day, desert night's hands;

so that, above the shore that I had reached,
the fair Aurora's white and scarlet cheeks
were, as Aurora aged, becoming orange.

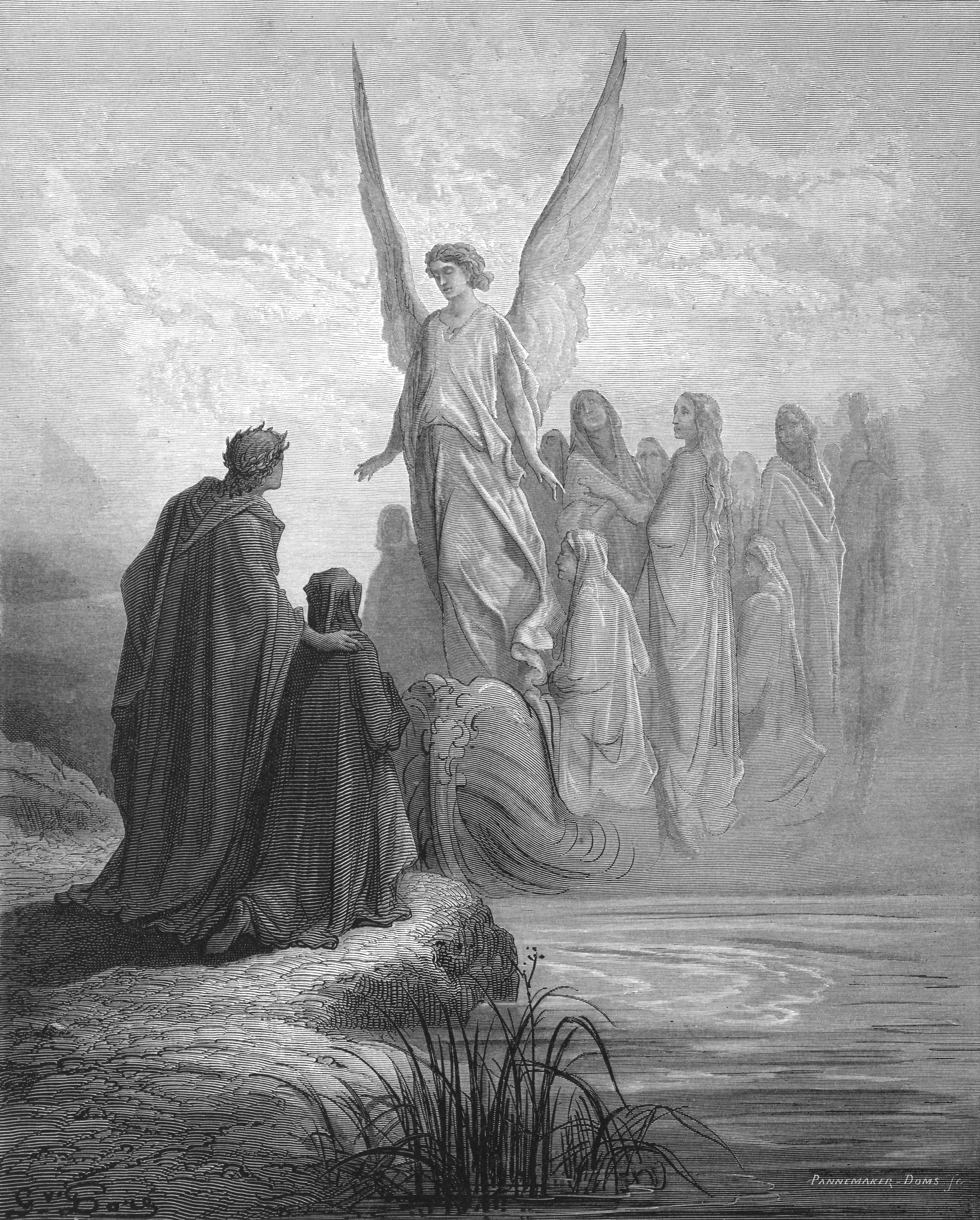
Purgatorio, Canto II: Christian souls arrive singing, escorted by an angel

In marked contrast to Charon's ferry across the Acheron in the Inferno, Christian souls are escorted by an angel pilot from their gathering place somewhere near Ostia, the seaport of Rome at the mouth of the Tiber, through the Pillars of Hercules across the seas to the Mountain of Purgatory. The souls arrive singing In exitu Israel de Aegypto. In his Letter to Cangrande, Dante explains that this reference to Israel leaving Egypt refers both to the redemption of Christ and to "the conversion of the soul from the sorrow and misery of sin to the state of grace". Dante recognises his friend Casella among the souls there (Canto II).

=== The Excommunicate ===
The poets begin to climb in the early hours of morning. On the lower slopes, Dante and Virgil first encounter the excommunicate, who are detained at the base of the cliff for a period thirty times as long as their period of contumacy. The excommunicate include Manfred of Sicily. Manfred explains that prayer from those currently alive and in the grace of God may reduce the amount of time a soul spends in purgatory. The meeting with Manfred is over by about 9 AM. (Canto III).

=== The Late-Repentant ===
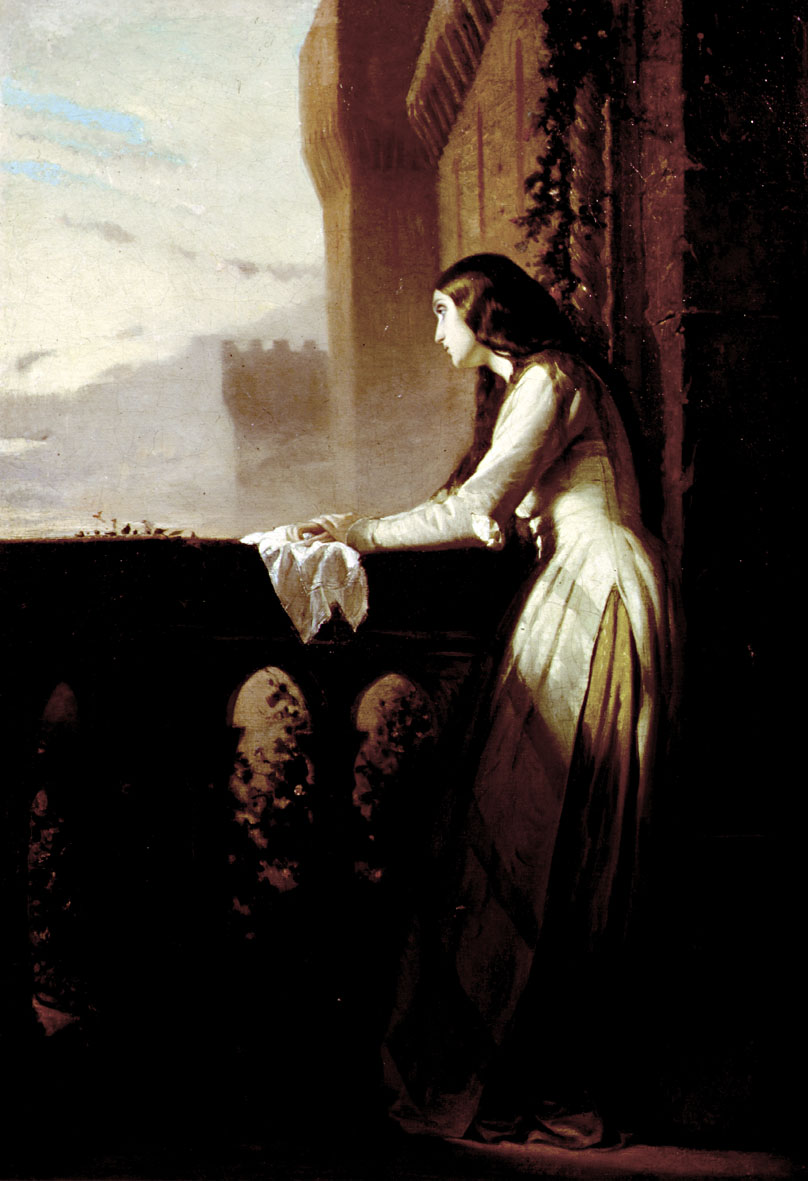
Pia de' Tolomei (La Pia) in a painting by Stefano Ussi, Canto V.

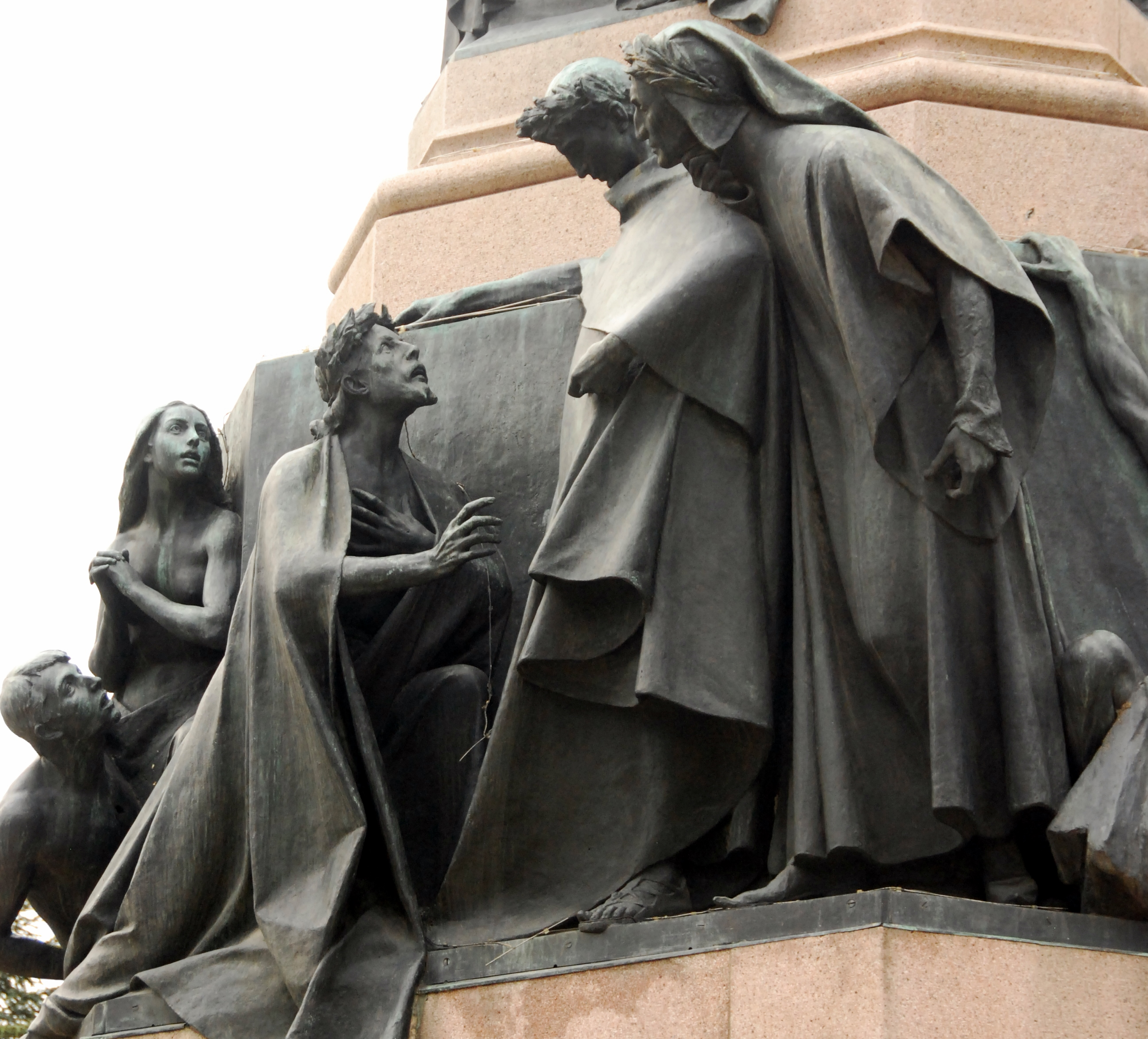
Dante and Virgil meet Sordello, in a sculpture by Cesare Zocchi, Canto VII.

The Late-Repentant include (1) those too lazy or too preoccupied to repent (the Indolent), (2) those who repented at the last minute without formally receiving last rites, as a result of violent deaths, and (3) the Negligent Rulers. These souls will be admitted to Purgatory thanks to their genuine repentance, but must wait outside for an amount of time equal to their lives on earth. The lazy include Belacqua (possibly a deceased friend of Dante), whom Dante is relieved to discover here, rather than in Hell. The meeting with Belacqua is over by noon (Canto IV).

Those not receiving last rites include Pia de' Tolomei of Siena, who was murdered by her husband, Nello della Pietra of the Maremma (Canto V):

"may you remember me, who am La Pia;
Siena made, Maremma unmade me:
he who, when we were wed, gave me his pledge
and then, as nuptial ring, his gem, knows that".

Also in this category is the troubadour Sordello who, like Virgil, is from Mantua. When Sordello discovers the great poet's identity, he bows down to him in honour. This helps keep Virgil in the foreground of the poem, since (as a resident of Limbo) Virgil is less qualified as a guide here than he was in Hell. As a resident of Purgatory, Sordello is able to explain the Rule of the Mountain: that after sunset souls are incapable of climbing any further. Allegorically, the sun represents God, meaning that progress in the penitent Christian life can only be made through Divine Grace. Virgil's conversation with Sordello ends as the sun is moving downward, that is, after 3 PM (Cantos VI to VII).

It is sunset, so Dante and his companions stop for the night in the Valley of the Princes where they meet persons whose preoccupation with public and private duties hampered their spiritual progress, particularly deceased monarchs such as Rudolph, Ottokar, Philip the Bold, and Henry III (Cantos VII and VIII). John Ciardi writes that these Negligent Rulers are "elevated above their negligent subjects because their special duties made it difficult for them to think about the welfare of their own souls". Dante also speaks with the souls of contemporary Italian statesmen Currado Malaspina and Nino Visconti, the latter being a personal friend whom Dante rejoices at not having found among the damned.

As night approaches, the souls sing the Compline hymns Salve Regina and Te lucis ante terminum. Dante's description of evening in this valley was the inspiration for a similar passage in Byron's Don Juan:

Purgatorio, Canto VIII, 1–6 (Longfellow)	Don Juan, Canto 3, CVIII, 1–6
'twas now the hour that turneth back desire In those who sail the sea, and melts the heart, The day they've said to their sweet friends farewell, And the new pilgrim penetrates with love, If he doth hear from far away a bell That seemeth to deplore the dying day,	Soft hour! which wakes the wish and melts the heart Of those who sail the seas, on the first day When they from their sweet friends are torn apart; Or fills with love the pilgrim on his way As the far bell of vesper makes him start, Seeming to weep the dying day's decay;

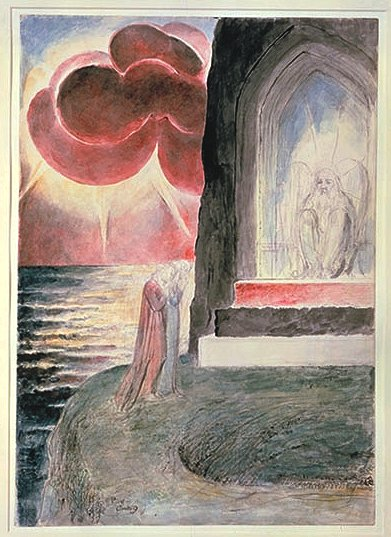
The Gate of Purgatory, painted by William Blake, Canto 9.

Dante falls asleep at 8:30 PM; his dream takes place just before the dawn of Easter Monday, one where a golden eagle sweeps him up into the sky. Awakening just after 8 AM, Dante finds that he has been carried up to the gate of Purgatory proper. Here there are three steps, representative of the tripartite Sacrament of Penance. The first is of white marble so polished it is reflective like a mirror, representing a candid, self-reflective confession and purity of the penitent's true self. The next step is dark and cracked, representing the sorrow and broken-heartedness of contrition. It has also been noted that the dark colour is the colour of mourning and the crack is in the shape of a Christian cross. The last step is blood red, symbolising the burning Love that ends a good confession, the blood of Christ, and the restoration of true life. (Canto IX).

The gate of Purgatory, Peter's Gate, is guarded by an angel bearing a naked sword, his countenance too bright for Dante's sight to sustain. In reply to the angel's challenge, Virgil declares that a lady by the name of Lucia brought them there and directed them to the gate. On Virgil's advice, Dante mounts the steps and pleads humbly for admission by the angel, who uses the point of his sword to draw the letter "P" (signifying peccatum, sin) seven times on Dante's forehead, bidding him "take heed that thou wash / These wounds, when thou shalt be within." With the passage of each terrace and the corresponding purgation of his soul that the pilgrim receives, one of the "P"s will be erased by the angel granting passage to the next terrace. The angel at Peter's Gate uses two keys, silver (remorse) and gold (reconciliation), to open the gate—both are necessary for redemption and salvation. As the poets are about to enter, they are warned not to look back.

== Seven terraces of Purgatory ==
After passing through the gate of Purgatory proper, Virgil guides the pilgrim Dante through the mountain's seven terraces. These correspond to the seven deadly sins or "seven roots of sinfulness": Pride, Envy, Wrath, Sloth, Avarice (and Prodigality), Gluttony, and Lust. The classification of sin here is more psychological than that of the Inferno, being based on motives rather than actions. It is also drawn primarily from Christian theology, rather than from classical sources. The core of the classification is based on love: the first three terraces of Purgatory relate to perverted love directed towards actual harm of others, the fourth terrace relates to deficient love (i.e. sloth or acedia), and the last three terraces relate to excessive or disordered love of good things. Each terrace purges a particular sin in an appropriate manner. Those in Purgatory can leave their circle voluntarily, but may only do so when they have corrected the flaw within themselves that led to committing that sin.

The structure of the poetic description of these terraces is more systematic than that of the Inferno, and associated with each terrace are an appropriate prayer and beatitude. Robert Hollander describes the shared features of all the terraces as "(1) description of the physical aspect of the terrace, (2) exemplars of the virtue that counters the sin repented here, (3) description of the penitents, (4) recitation of their sins by particular penitents, (5) exemplars of the vice, (6) appearance to Dante of the angel representing the countering virtue".

=== First terrace (Pride) ===
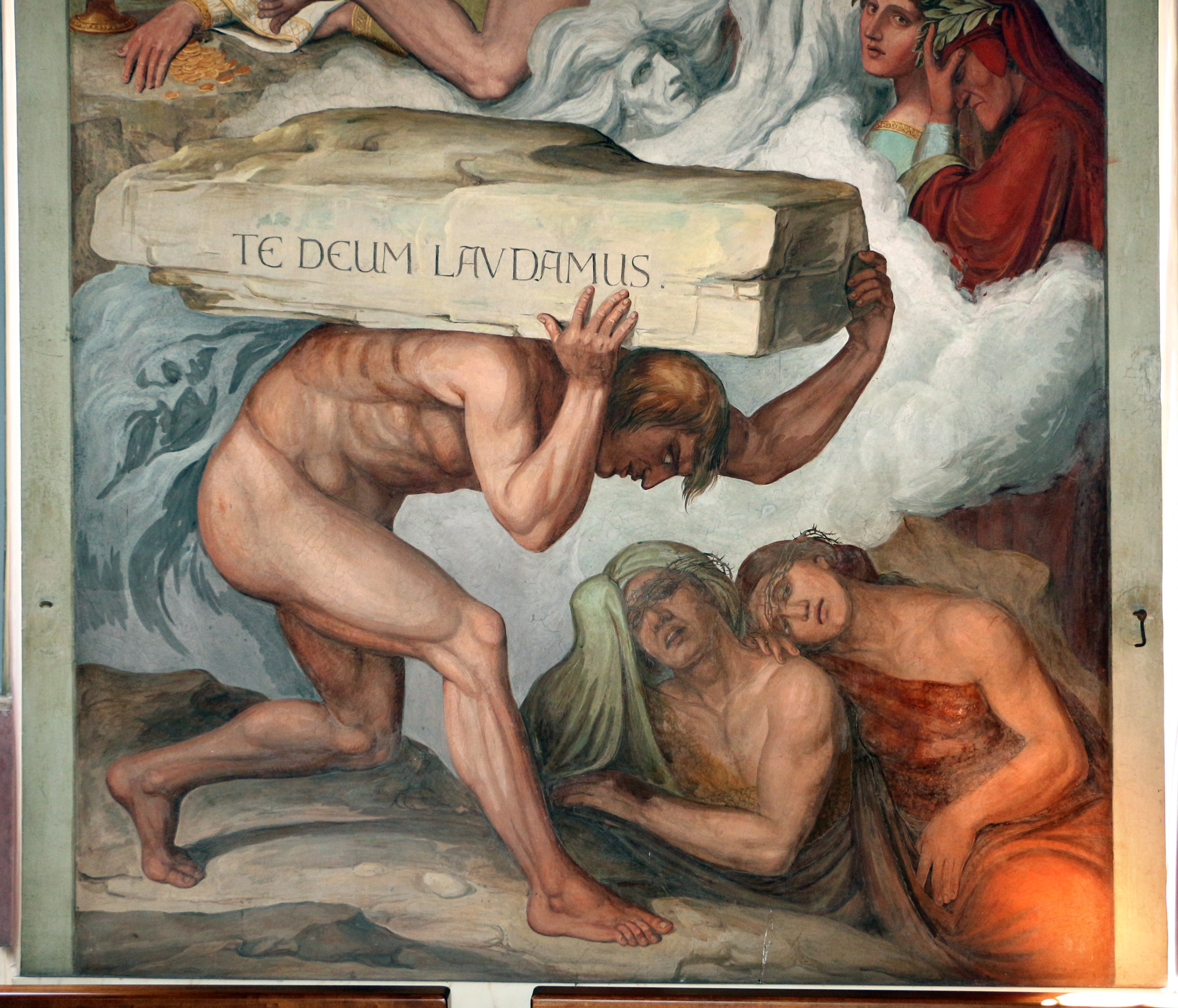
The first terrace of Purgatory as depicted by Joseph Anton Koch

The first three terraces of Purgatory relate to sins caused by a perverted love directed towards actual harm of others.

The first of the sins is Pride. Dante and Virgil begin to ascend this terrace shortly after 9 AM. On the terrace where proud souls purge their sin, Dante and Virgil see sculptures expressing humility, the opposite virtue. The first example is of the Annunciation to the Virgin Mary, where she responds to the angel Gabriel with the words Ecce ancilla Dei ("Behold the handmaid of the Lord," Luke 1:38). An example of humility from classical history is the Emperor Trajan, who, according to a medieval legend, once stopped his journey to render justice to a poor widow (Canto X).

Also associated with humility is an expanded version of the Lord's Prayer:

"Our Father, You who dwell within the heavens
but are not circumscribed by them out of
Your greater love for Your first works above,

Praised be Your name and Your omnipotence,
by every creature, just as it is seemly
to offer thanks to Your sweet effluence.

Your kingdom's peace come unto us, for if
it does not come, then though we summon all
our force, we cannot reach it of our selves.

Just as Your angels, as they sing Hosanna,
offer their wills to You as sacrifice,
so may men offer up their wills to You.

Give unto us this day the daily manna
without which he who labours most to move
ahead through this harsh wilderness falls back.

Even as we forgive all who have done
us injury, may You, benevolent,
forgive, and do not judge us by our worth.

Try not our strength, so easily subdued,
against the ancient foe, but set it free
from him who goads it to perversity".

After being introduced to humility, Dante and Virgil meet the souls of the proud, who are bent over by the weight of huge stones on their backs. As they walk around the terrace, they are to profit from the sculpted examples of humility. The first of these souls is Omberto Aldobrandeschi, whose pride lies in his descent ("I was Italian, son of a great Tuscan: / my father was Guiglielmo Aldobrandesco"), although he is learning to be more humble ("I / do not know if you have heard his name"). Oderisi of Gubbio is an example of pride in achievements—he was a noted artist of illuminated manuscripts. Provenzano Salvani, leader of the Sienese Ghibellines, is an example of pride in dominating others (Canto XI).

In Canto XIII, Dante points out, with "frank self-awareness," that pride is also a serious flaw of his own:

"I fear much more the punishment below;
my soul is anxious, in suspense; already
I feel the heavy weights of the first terrace".

After his conversations with the proud, Dante notes further sculptures on the pavement below, this time illustrating pride itself. The sculptures show Satan (Lucifer), the building of the Tower of Babel, King Saul, Niobe, Arachne, and King Rehoboam, amongst others.

The poets reach the stairway to the second terrace at noon. As they ascend, the Angel of Humility salutes them and brushes Dante's forehead with his wings, erasing the letter "P" (peccatum) corresponding to the sin of pride, and Dante hears the beatitude Beati pauperes spiritu ("Blessed are the poor in spirit", Matthew 5:3) (Canto XII). Dante is surprised to discover that climbing now seems easier than it did before. Virgil tells him that one of the initials has been removed from his forehead by the angel and that the effort will be increasingly lessened as he climbs higher. Dante compares the stairway to the easy ascent from the Rubiconte, a bridge in Florence, up to San Miniato al Monte, overlooking the city.

=== Second terrace (Envy) ===
Envy is the sin that "looks with grudging hatred upon other men's gifts and good fortune, taking every opportunity to run them down or deprive them of their happiness". (This in contrast to covetousness, the excessive desire to have things like money.) As one of the envious souls on this terrace says:

"My blood was so afire with envy that,
when I had seen a man becoming happy,
the lividness in me was plain to see".

On entering the terrace of the envious, Dante and Virgil first hear voices on the air telling stories of generosity, the opposite virtue. There is, as in all the other terraces, an episode from the life of the Virgin Mary; this time, the scene from the Life of the Virgin is the Wedding at Cana, in which she expresses her joy for the newly married couple and encourages Christ to perform his first miracle. There is also Jesus' saying "Love your enemies". A classical story shows the friendship between Orestes and Pylades.

The souls of the envious wear penitential grey cloaks, and their eyes are sewn shut with iron wire, resembling the way a falconer sews shut the eyes of a falcon in order to train it. This results in audible, rather than visual, examples here. Dante and Virgil speak with Sapia Salvani (Canto XIII).

The souls of the envious include Guido del Duca and Rinieri da Calboli. The former speaks bitterly about the ethics of people in towns along the River Arno:

"That river starts its miserable course
among foul hogs, more fit for acorns than
for food devised to serve the needs of man.

Then, as that stream descends, it comes on curs
that, though their force is feeble, snap and snarl;
scornful of them, it swerves its snout away.

And, downward, it flows on; and when that ditch,
ill-fated and accursed, grows wider, it
finds, more and more, the dogs becoming wolves.

Descending then through many dark ravines,
it comes on foxes so full of deceit
there is no trap that they cannot defeat".

The voices on the air also include examples of envy. The classical example is Aglauros, who, according to Ovid, was turned to stone because she was jealous of Hermes' love for her older sister Herse. The Biblical example is Cain, mentioned here not for his act of fratricide, but for the jealousy of his younger brother Abel that led to it (Canto XIV).

It is middle afternoon and the poets are walking westward along the terrace with the sun in their faces. A dazzling brightness suddenly smites Dante on the brow, which he supposes is caused by the sun; but when he shades his eyes from it, the new brightness persists, and he is forced to close his eyes. Virgil reminds him that the approach of an angel is still too powerful for his earthly senses but says that this will not always be so. The Angel of Charity, having brushed away another "P" from Dante's brow, invites him to mount to the next terrace. As he is leaving the terrace, the dazzling light of the terrace's angel causes Dante to reveal his scientific knowledge, observing that the angle of incidence is equal to the angle of reflection "as theory and experiment will show" (Canto XV).

=== Third terrace (Wrath) ===
On the terrace of the wrathful, which the poets reach at 3 PM, examples of meekness (the opposite virtue) are given to Dante as visions in his mind. The scene from the Life of the Virgin in this terrace of purgation is the Finding in the Temple. Whereas most parents would be angry at their child for worrying them, Mary is loving and understanding of Christ's motives behind his three-day disappearance. In a classical example, the wife of Peisistratos wanted a young man executed for embracing their daughter, to which Peisistratos responded: "What shall we do to one who'd injure us / if one who loves us earns our condemnation?" Saint Stephen provides a Biblical example, drawn from Acts 7:54–60 (Canto XV):

Next I saw people whom the fire of wrath
had kindled, as they stoned a youth and kept
on shouting loudly to each other: "Kill!"

"Kill!" "Kill!" I saw him now, weighed down by death,
sink to the ground, although his eyes were bent
always on Heaven – they were Heaven's gates –

Praying to his high Lord, despite the torture,
to pardon those who were his persecutors;
his look was such that it unlocked compassion.

The souls of the wrathful walk around in blinding acrid smoke, which symbolises the blinding effect of anger:

Darkness of Hell and of a night deprived
of every planet, under meager skies,
as overcast by clouds as sky can be,

had never served to veil my eyes so thickly
nor covered them with such rough-textured stuff
as smoke that wrapped us there in Purgatory;

my eyes could not endure remaining open ...

The prayer for this terrace is the Agnus Dei: Agnus Dei, qui tollis peccata mundi, miserere nobis ... dona nobis pacem ("Lamb of God, you who take away the sins of the world, have mercy upon us ... grant us peace").

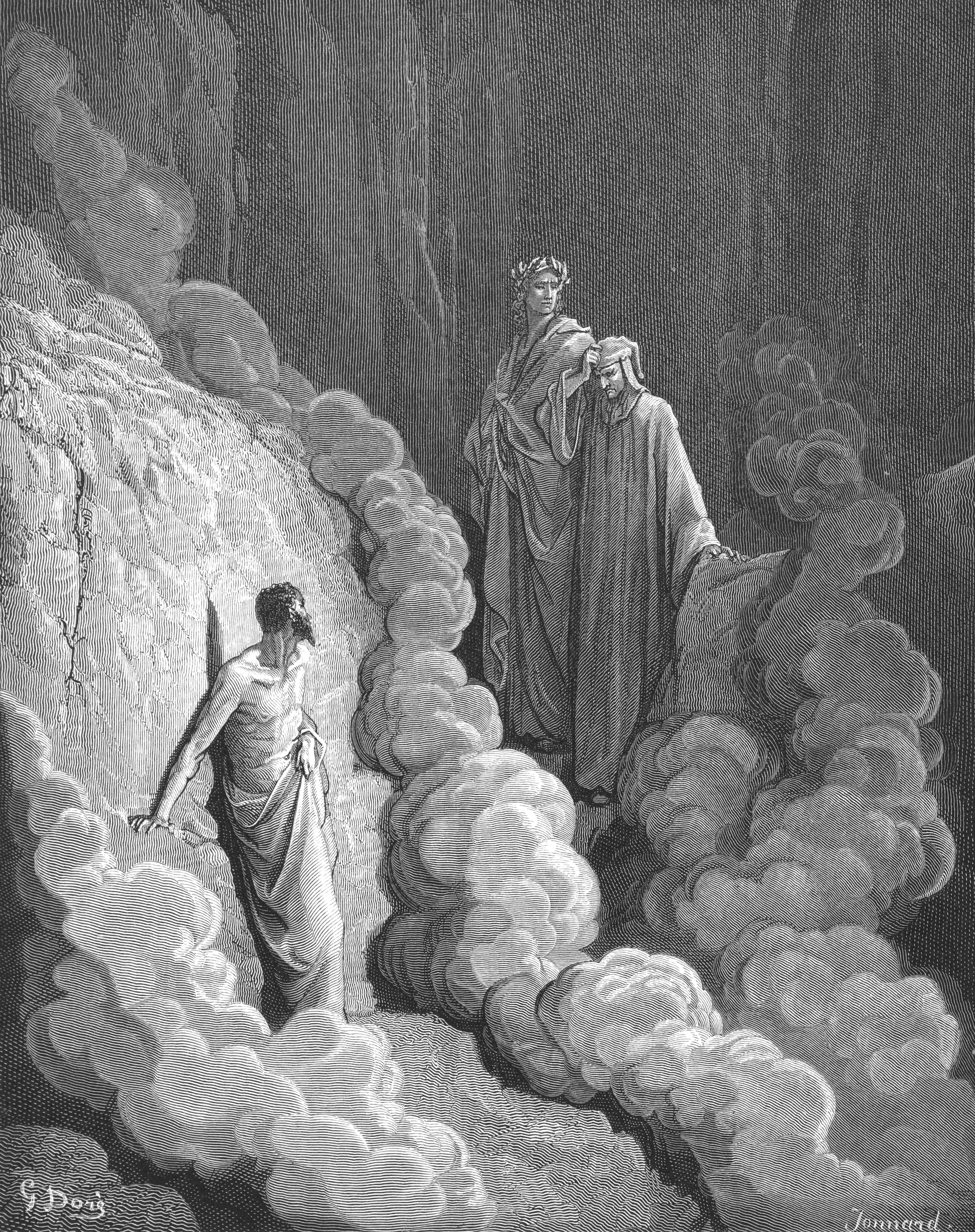
Dante and Virgil talking with Marco Lombardo as depicted by Gustave Doré

Marco Lombardo discourses with Dante on free will—a relevant topic, since there is no point being angry with someone who has no choice over his actions (Canto XVI). Dante also sees visions with examples of wrath, such as Procne, Haman and Lavinia. When the visions have passed, the Angel of Peace appears to greet them. Again the brightness overpowers Dante's sight, but he hears the angel's invitation to mount to the next terrace and feels a wing brush his forehead, erasing the third "P". Then follows the pronouncing of the beatitude Beati pacifici ("Blessed are the peacemakers"). The poets leave the third terrace just after nightfall (Canto XVII).

While staying on the fourth terrace, Virgil is able to explain to Dante the organisation of Purgatory and its relationship to perverted, deficient, or misdirected love. The three terraces they have seen so far have purged the proud ("he who, through abasement of another, / hopes for supremacy"), the envious ("one who, when he is outdone, / fears his own loss of fame, power, honour, favour; / his sadness loves misfortune for his neighbor".), and the wrathful ("he who, over injury / received, resentful, for revenge grows greedy / and, angrily, seeks out another's harm"). Deficient and misdirected loves are about to follow. Virgil's discourse on love concludes at midnight (Cantos XVII and XVIII).

=== Fourth terrace (Sloth) ===
On the fourth terrace we find souls whose sin was that of deficient love—that is, sloth or acedia. Since they had failed in life to act in pursuit of love, here they are engaged in ceaseless activity. The examples of sloth and of zeal, its opposite virtue, are called out by these souls as they run around the terrace. A scene from the life of the Virgin outlined in this terrace is the Visitation, with Mary going "in haste" to visit her cousin Elizabeth. These examples also include episodes from the lives of Julius Caesar and Aeneas. This activity also replaces a verbal prayer for this terrace. Since the formerly slothful are now too busy to converse at length, this section of the poem is a short one.

Allegorically, spiritual laziness and lack of caring lead to sadness, and so the beatitude for this terrace is Beati qui lugent ("Blessed are those who mourn, for they will be comforted," Matthew 5:4) (Canto XVIII and XIX).

Dante's second night's sleep occurs while the poets are on this terrace, and Dante dreams shortly before Tuesday's dawn of a Siren, symbol of disordered or excessive love represented by greed, gluttony and lust. Upon awakening from the dream in the light of the sun, Dante is visited by the Angel of Zeal, who removes another "P" from his brow, and the two poets climb toward the fifth terrace (Canto XIX).

=== Fifth terrace (Avarice) ===
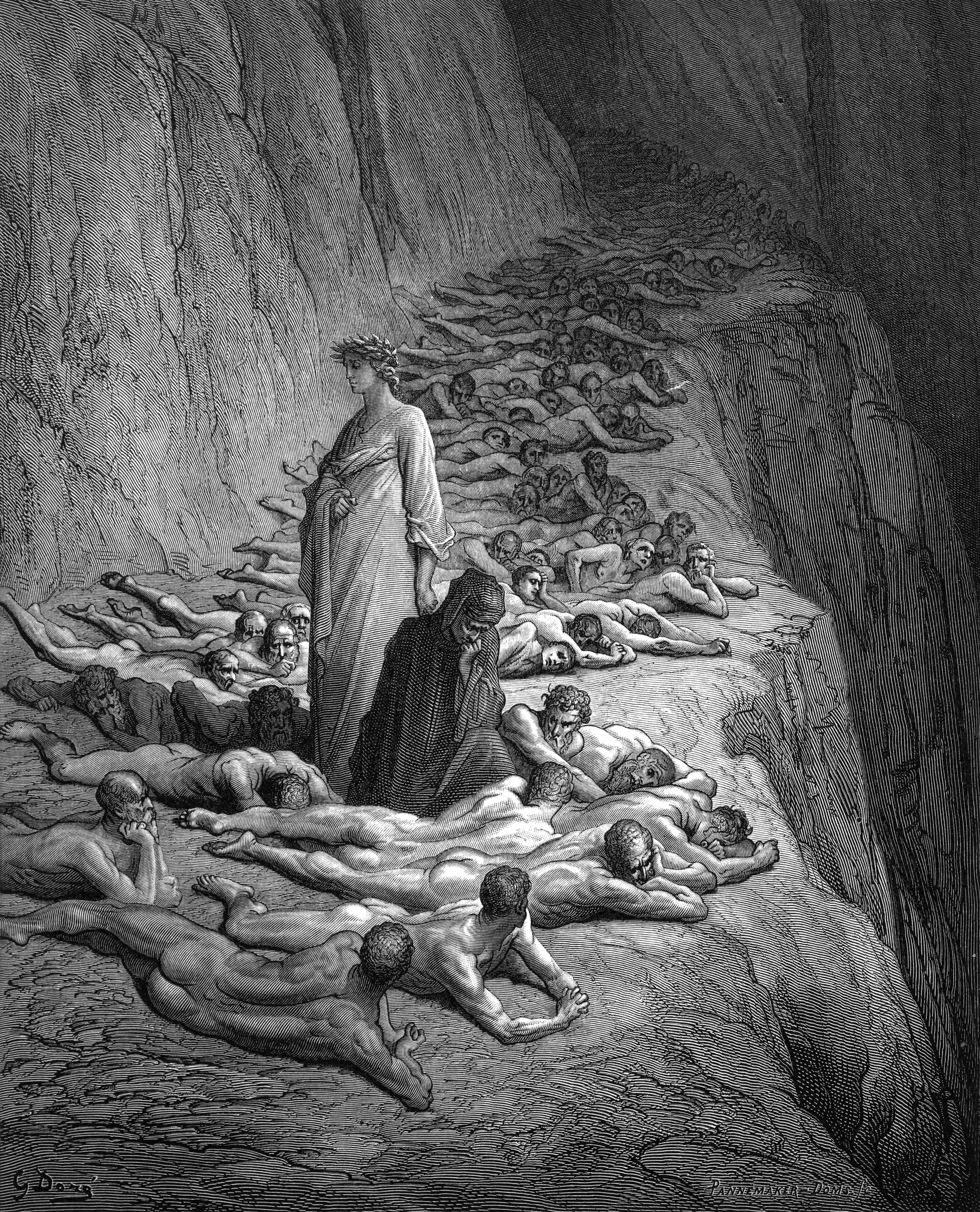
Dante speaks to the shade of Pope Adrian V, Canto 19

On the last three terraces are those who sinned by loving good things, but loving them in an excessive or disordered way.

On the fifth terrace, excessive concern for earthly goods—whether in the form of greed, ambition or extravagance—is punished and purified. The avaricious and prodigal lie face-down on the ground, reciting the psalm Adhaesit pavimento anima mea, taken from Psalm 119:25 ("My soul cleaveth unto the dust: quicken thou me according to thy word"), which is a prayer expressing the desire to follow God's law. Dante meets the shade of Pope Adrian V, an exemplar of desire for ecclesiastical power and prestige, who directs the poets on their way (Canto XIX).

The scene from the Life of the Virgin, used here to counter the sin of avarice, is the humble birth of Christ. Further down the terrace, Hugh Capet personifies greed for worldly wealth and possessions. He bemoans the way that, in contrast, avarice has motivated the actions of his successors, and "prophesies" events which occurred after the date in which the poem is set, but before the poem was written:

"The other, who once left his ship as prisoner
I see him sell his daughter, bargaining
as pirates haggle over female slaves.

O Avarice, my house is now your captive:
it traffics in the flesh of its own children
what more is left for you to do to us?

That past and future evil may seem less,
I see the fleur-de-lis enter Anagni
and, in His vicar, Christ made prisoner.

I see Him mocked a second time; I see
the vinegar and gall renewed and He
is slain between two thieves who're still alive.

And I see the new Pilate, one so cruel
that, still not sated, he, without decree,
carries his greedy sails into the Temple".

These events include Charles II of Naples selling his daughter into marriage to an elderly and disreputable man, and Philip IV of France ("the fleur-de-lis") arresting Pope Boniface VIII in 1303 (a pope destined for Hell, according to the Inferno, but still, in Dante's view, the Vicar of Christ). Dante also refers to the suppression of the Knights Templar at Philip's instigation in 1307, which freed Philip from debts he owed to the order. Following the exemplars of avarice (these are Pygmalion, Midas, Achan, Ananias and Sapphira, Heliodorus, Polymestor, and Crassus), there is a sudden earthquake accompanied by the shouting of Gloria in excelsis Deo. Dante desires to understand the cause of the earthquake, but he does not question Virgil about it (Canto XX).

In a scene that Dante links to the episode where Jesus meets two disciples on the road to Emmaus, Dante and Virgil are overtaken by a shade who eventually reveals himself as the Roman poet Statius, author of the Thebaid. Statius explains the cause of the earthquake: there is a tremor when a soul knows that it is ready to ascend to heaven, which he has just experienced. Dante presents Statius, without obvious or understandable basis, as a convert to Christianity; as a Christian, his guidance will supplement Virgil's. Statius is overjoyed to find himself in the company of Virgil, whose Aeneid he so greatly admired (Canto XXI).

The Angel of Moderation directs the poets to the passage leading to the next region after brushing another "P" from Dante's forehead. Virgil and Statius converse as they ascend toward the next ledge. Statius explains that he was not avaricious but prodigal, but that he "converted" from prodigality by reading Virgil, which directed him to poetry and to God. Statius explains how he was baptized, but he remained a secret Christian—this is the cause of his purgation of Sloth on the previous terrace. Statius asks Virgil to name his fellow poets and figures in Limbo, which he does (Canto XXII).

=== Sixth terrace (Gluttony) ===
It is between 10 and 11 AM, and the three poets begin to circle the sixth terrace where the gluttonous are purged, and more generally, those who over-emphasised food, drink, and bodily comforts. In a scene reminiscent of the punishment of Tantalus, they are starved in the presence of trees whose fruit is forever out of reach. The examples here are given by voices in the trees. The Virgin Mary, who shared her Son's gifts with others at the Wedding at Cana, and John the Baptist, who only lived on locusts and honey (Matthew 3:4), is an example of the virtue of temperance. A classical example of the opposite vice of gluttony is the drunkenness of the Centaurs that led to the Battle of Centaurs and Lapiths.

The prayer for this terrace is Labia mea Domine (Psalm 51:15: "O Lord, open my lips, and my mouth will declare your praise"). These are the opening words from the daily Liturgy of the Hours, which is also the source of prayers for the fifth and seventh terraces (Cantos XXII through XXIV).

Here Dante also meets his friend Forese Donati and his poetic predecessor Bonagiunta Orbicciani. Bonagiunta has kind words for Dante's earlier work La Vita Nuova, describing its technique as the dolce stil novo ("sweet new style"). He quotes the line "Ladies that have intelligence of love," written in praise of Beatrice, whom he will meet later in the Purgatorio:

Ladies that have intelligence of Love,
I of my lady wish with you to speak;
Not that I can believe to end her praise,
But to discourse that I may ease my mind.
I say that when I think upon her worth,
So sweet doth Love make himself feel to me,
That if I then should lose not hardihood,
Speaking, I should enamour all mankind.

Dante is now greeted by the Angel of Temperance, whose brightness is like the red glow of molten metal or glass. Showing the passage up the mountain, the angel removes another "P" from Dante's brow with a puff of his wing, and he pronounces the beatitude in paraphrase: "Blessed are they who are so illumined by grace that the love of food does not kindle their desires beyond what is fitting" (Canto XXIV). It is 2:00 PM when the three poets leave the sixth terrace and begin their ascent to the seventh terrace, meaning that they have spent four hours among the Gluttonous. During the climb, Dante wonders how it is possible for bodiless souls to have the gaunt appearance of the souls being starved here. In explaining, Statius discourses on the nature of the soul and its relationship to the body (Canto XXV).

=== Seventh terrace (Lust) ===
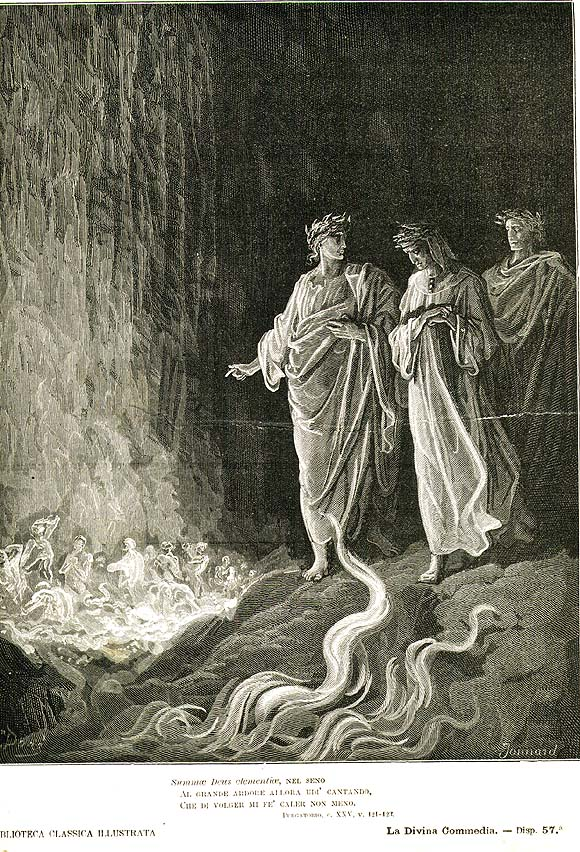
Virgil, Dante, and Statius beside the flames of the seventh terrace, Canto 25

The terrace of lust, the final terrace of Purgatory and the final vice of excessive love, has an immense wall of flame through which every soul must pass (Canto XXV). As a prayer, they sing the hymn Summae Deus clementiae ("God of Supreme Clemency") from the Liturgy of the Hours. Souls repenting of misdirected sexual desire call out in praise of chastity, such as Diana's, and of marital fidelity.

Two groups of souls run through the flames calling out examples of lust (Sodom and Gomorrah by the homosexual and Pasiphaë by the heterosexual). The homosexuals run counter to the sun, from west to east, symbolising their sins against nature and God, while the heterosexuals run from east to west, with the sun. Dante's depiction of homosexuals as souls capable of salvation is particularly lenient for the time period and is often omitted from later illustrations of Purgatorio. In addition, this depiction is a marked massive departure from Inferno, where Dante represents sodomy as a sin of violence instead of one of excessive love.

When they meet, the two groups exchange a brief kiss of greeting and a sign of peace before the homosexuals continue and the heterosexuals approach the pilgrim. The pilgrim prays for both groups' ascent into heaven and stops to speak to Guido Guinizelli, who explains the nature of the vice purged on this terrace and calls the sodomites those who "committed the offense for which Caesar ... once heard himself reproached as 'Queen'", alluding to Julius Caesar's alleged same-sex relationships.

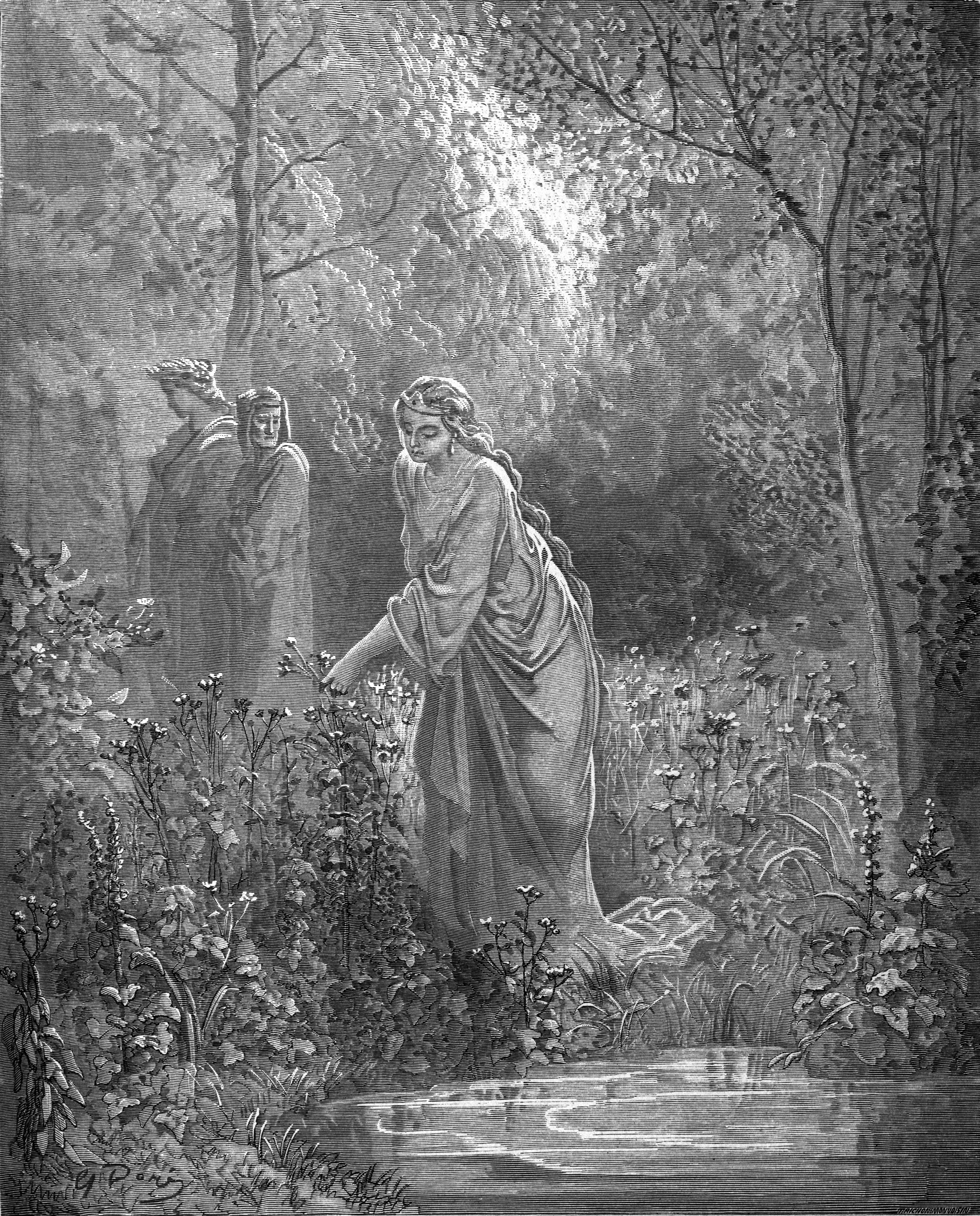
Dante dreams of Leah picking flowers, symbol of the active (non-monastic) Christian life, Canto 27

Shortly before sunset, the poets are greeted by the Angel of Chastity, who instructs them to pass through the wall of fire. By reminding Dante that Beatrice can be found in the Earthly Paradise on the other side, Virgil finally persuades Dante to pass through the intense fire. After the poets pass through the flame, the sun sets and they lie down to sleep on the steps between the final terrace and the Earthly Paradise. On these steps, just before the dawn of Wednesday morning, Dante has his third dream: a vision of Leah and Rachel. They are symbols of the active (lay, or secular) and contemplative (monastic) Christian lives, both important.

... in my dream, I seemed to see a woman
both young and fair; along a plain she gathered
flowers, and even as she sang, she said:

"Whoever asks my name, know that I'm Leah,
and I apply my lovely hands to fashion
a garland of the flowers I have gathered.

To find delight within this mirror I
adorn myself; whereas my sister Rachel
never deserts her mirror; there she sits

all day; she longs to see her fair eyes gazing,
as I, to see my hands adorning, long:
she is content with seeing, I with labour".

Dante awakens with the dawn, and the poets continue up the rest of the ascent until they come in sight of the Earthly Paradise (Canto XXVII).

== Earthly Paradise ==
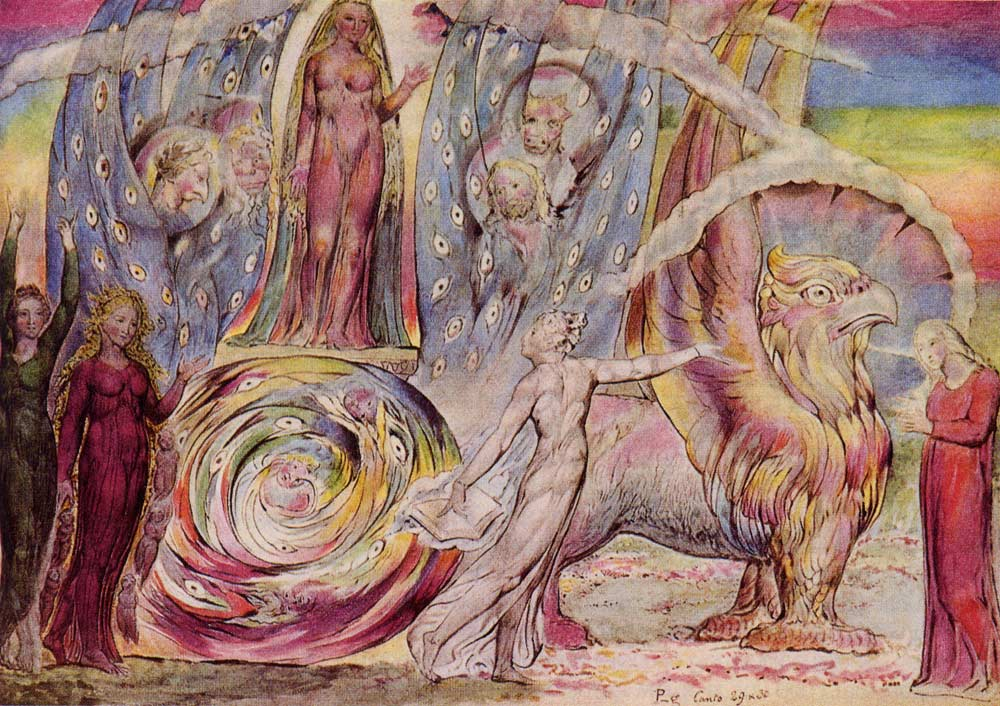
Beatrice Addressing Dante, by William Blake, showing the "chariot triumphal" bearing Beatrice and drawn by the Griffin, with four of the ladies representing virtues, Canto 29

At the summit of Mount Purgatory is the Earthly Paradise or Garden of Eden. Allegorically, it represents the state of innocence that existed before Adam and Eve fell from grace—the state which Dante's journey up Mount Purgatory has recaptured.

=== The Heavenly Pageant ===
Here Dante meets Matilda, a woman whose literal and allegorical identity "is perhaps the most tantalising problem in the Comedy". Critics up to the early twentieth century tended to connect her with the historical Matilda of Tuscany, but more recently some have suggested a connection with the dream of Leah in Canto XXVII. Be that as it may, Matilda clearly prepares Dante for his meeting with Beatrice, the woman to whom (historically) Dante dedicated his previous poetry, the woman at whose request (in the story) Virgil was commissioned to bring Dante on his journey, and the woman who (allegorically) symbolises the path to God (Canto XXVIII).

With Matilda, Dante witnesses a procession which forms an allegory within the allegory, somewhat like Shakespeare's play within a play. It has a very different style from the Purgatorio as a whole, having the form of a masque, where the characters are walking symbols rather than real people. The procession consists of (Canto XXIX):

- "Twenty-four elders" (a reference to Revelation 4:4), representing the 24 books of the Hebrew Bible, as classified by Jerome
- "Four animals" with "six wings as plumage" (a reference to Revelation 4:6–8), a traditional representation of the four Evangelists
- "A chariot triumphal on two wheels," bearing Beatrice, which is drawn by…
- A griffin, representing the conjoined divinity and humanity of Christ
- "Three circling women" coloured red, green, and white, representing the three theological virtues: Love, Hope, and Faith, respectively
- "Four other women" dressed in purple, representing the four cardinal virtues: Prudence, Justice, Temperance, and Fortitude
- "Two elders, different in their dress," representing the Acts of the Apostles and the Pauline epistles
- "Four of humble aspect," representing the general epistles
- "When all the rest had passed, a lone old man," representing the Book of Revelation

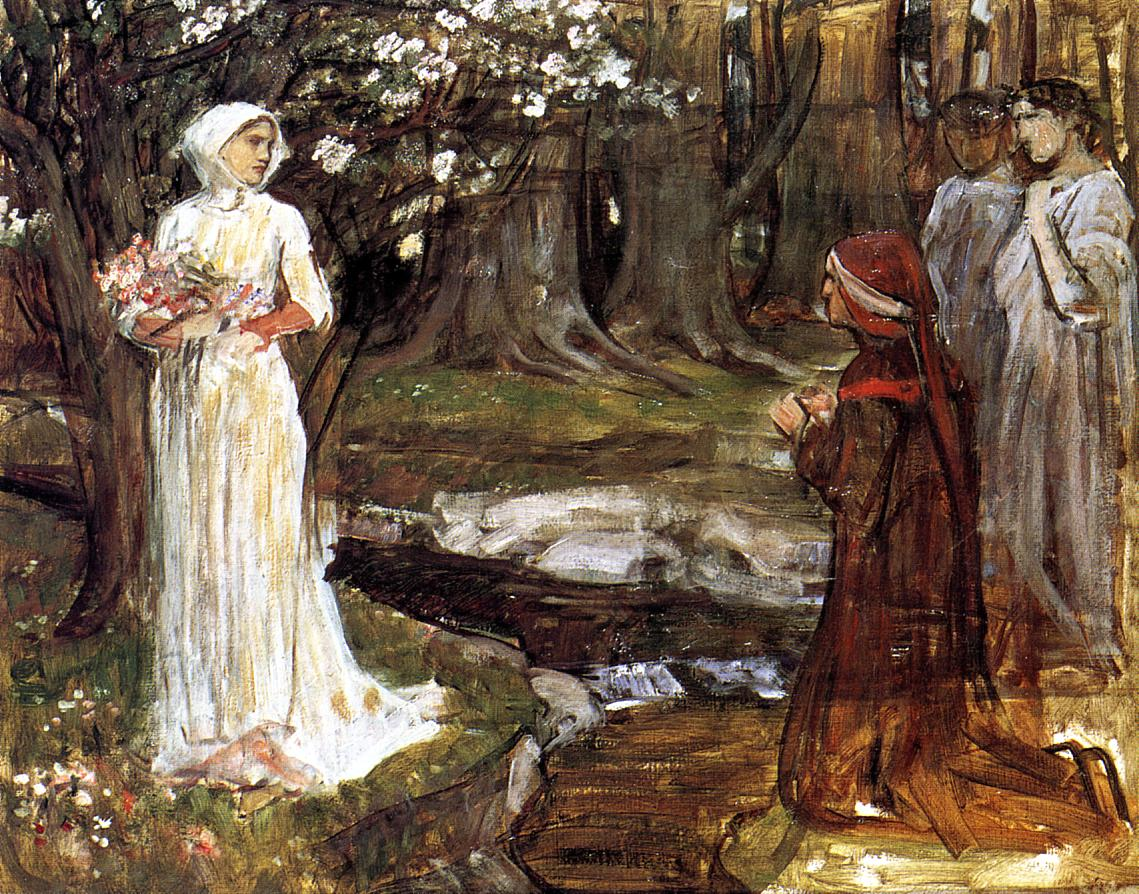
Dante and Matilda (formerly called Dante and Beatrice) by John William Waterhouse, 1915

=== Beatrice's arrival ===
Canto XXX portrays the transition between Virgil's departure and Beatrice's arrival. Now that the pilgrim has completed his training in desire and reached the limits of human reason, Virgil can no longer serve as his guide: he has nothing more to teach Dante, because human reason cannot explain or understand divine grace. Beatrice, by contrast, is capable of teaching Dante the meaning of that grace, because she is Christian, and endowed with understanding by God.

Even as Virgil departs, however, his influence on the poem remains strong. Dante's farewell to Virgil, with the threefold repetition of Virgil's name, echoes a passage from Virgil's Georgics, wherein Orpheus calls out to Eurydice after he has turned around and condemned her to eternity in the land of the dead.

After Virgil's departure, Beatrice begins to admonish Dante, accusing him of straying from the path of virtue she had laid before him after her departure from life on earth. She demands a confession from the pilgrim—his first personal confession in the whole Comedy:

"O you who are beyond the sacred river,"
turning toward me the point of her speech, whose
mere edge had seemed sharp to me,
she began again, continuing without delay: "say,
say if this is true: to so great an accusation your
confession must be joined".

It is not until after more admonitions from Beatrice and a heartfelt confession from Dante that Dante is washed in the River Lethe, which erases the memory of past sin (Canto XXXI), and sees an allegory of Biblical and Church history. This allegory includes a denunciation of the corrupt papacy of the time: a harlot (the papacy) is dragged away with the chariot (the Church) by a giant (the French monarchy, which under King Philip IV engineered the move of the Papal Seat to Avignon in 1309) (Canto XXXII):

Just like a fortress set on a steep slope,
securely seated there, ungirt, a whore,
whose eyes were quick to rove, appeared to me;

and I saw at her side, erect, a giant,
who seemed to serve as her custodian;
and they again, again embraced each other.

It is noon as the events observed in the Earthly Paradise come to a close. Finally, Dante drinks from the River Eunoë, which restores good memories, and prepares him for his ascent to Heaven (described in the Paradiso, the final cantica). As with the other two parts of the Divine Comedy, the Purgatorio ends on the word "stars" (Canto XXXIII):

From that most holy wave I now returned
to Beatrice; remade, as new trees are
renewed when they bring forth new boughs, I was
pure and prepared to climb unto the stars.

== Location, shape, and size ==
Scholars have long debated the location, shape, and size of various geographic features in the Divine Comedy using astronomical and geometric calculations.

Dante tells us that Mount Purgatory is at the antipodes of Jerusalem, in the South Pacific.

In the Renaissance, Antonio Manetti and Alessandro Vellutello proposed models which Galileo Galilei refuted in his On the Shape, Location, and Size of Dante's Inferno. In the 20th century, Rodolfo Benini and Ideale Capasso, and in the 21st, Claudio Facciolo contributed to the debate. The calculations result in an area between 115.6 and 1243 km² and a height between 11.4 and 192 km high. The slope would have been between 23° and 37°.

In the 21st century, Erwan Dianteill introduced a different perspective, based on medieval geomancy. Following the geomancy manuals of Bartolomeo da Parma, Dianteill argues that the shape of the mountain of the Purgatorio follows a series of triplicities and "geomantic shields". Indeed, one of the geomantic figures is called "Mons Excelsus" ("Highest Mountain") according to Bartolomeo da Parma.

== In the arts ==
The Divine Comedy has been a source of inspiration for numerous artists for over seven centuries. While references to the Inferno are the most common, there are also references to the Purgatorio. Franz Liszt's Symphony to Dante's Divina Commedia (1856) has a "Purgatorio" movement, as does Robert W. Smith's The Divine Comedy (2006). Chaucer and others have referenced the Purgatorio in their writing. Many visual artists have depicted scenes from the Purgatorio, including Gustave Doré, John Flaxman, Dante Gabriel Rossetti, John William Waterhouse, and William Blake.

== See also ==
- Divine Comedy
- Inferno
- Paradiso
- Allegory in the Middle Ages
- List of cultural references in the Divine Comedy
- Rupes Nigra, a mountain or magnetic rock believed to exist on the North Pole during medieval times
