= On the Shape, Location, and Size of Dante's Inferno =

Lectures by Galileo

On the Shape, Location, and Size of Dante's Inferno is the title of two lectures by Galileo Galilei presented in 1588 upon invitation by the Florentine Academy. The lectures secured him a job as a lecturer of mathematics at the University of Pisa. Galileo attempted to mathematically map Dante's description of hell, trying to bridge the Divine Comedy and scientific thinking. According to professor Mark Peterson, Galileo may have had a secondary aim, to attack the cosmological model of hell proposed by Alessandro Vellutello of Lucca, while supporting another model by the Florentine architect Antonio Manetti during the animosity between the two cities. The lectures were not mentioned by Galileo's first biographer, Vincenzo Viviani, but are available in the standard 20-volume Opere of Galileo among the "literary" writings in Volume 9.

== Contents ==
Since the publication of Divine Comedy in 1314, scholars had attempted to map the physical features of Dante's Inferno, such as the blasted valleys, caverns and the roiling rivers of fire. In his lectures Galileo suggested that many commonly accepted dimensions did not stand up to mathematical scrutiny. Using complex geometrical analysis, Galileo calculated that Vellutello's description of the hell's structure, such as the massive cylinders descending to the center of the Earth, would, in reality, collapse under their own weight.

Firstly Galileo tried to estimate the width of the hell's vaulted roof. According to Dante, the centre of the roof lay in Jerusalem: "Already the Sun was joined to the horizon / Whose meridian circle covers / Jerusalem with its highest point". To prove Dante's description of the Sun being "joined to the horizon", Galileo interpreted this to mean that the diameter of hell's circle must be equal to the radius of the Earth. This meant that the boundary of the roof on the west would pass through Marseille in France and through Tashkent in modern-day Uzbekistan on the east. Galileo then tried to estimate the roof's thickness which would have to prevent its collapse on the captives beneath. He tried to scale up the dome of the Florence Cathedral (known to be 45 metres wide but only 3 metres thick) and concluded that the roof of hell would have to be 600 kilometres thick.

== See also ==
- Purgatorio#Location, shape, and size
