= Lethe =

River of forgetfulness in the Greek underworld

In Greek mythology, Lethe (/ˈliːθiː/; Ancient Greek: Λήθη Lḗthē; Ancient Greek: [lɛ̌ːtʰɛː], Modern Greek: [ˈliθi]) was one of the rivers of the underworld of Hades. In Classical Greek, the word lethe (λήθη) literally means "forgetting", "forgetfulness". The river is also known as Amelēs Potamos, or the "river of unmindfulness".

The Lethe flowed around the cave of Hypnos and through the Underworld where all those who drank from it experienced complete forgetfulness. The river was often associated with Lethe, the personification of forgetfulness and oblivion, who was the daughter of Eris (Strife).

== Mythology ==
Lethe, the river of forgetfulness, was one of the five rivers of the Greek underworld; the other four are Acheron (the river of sorrow), Cocytus (the river of lamentation), Phlegethon (the river of fire) and Styx (the river that separates Earth and the Underworld). In myth, the shades of the dead were only able to be reincarnated after they drank from the Lethe which would wash away all their memories.

=== Location ===
The river Lethe was said to be located next to Hades's palace in the underworld under a cypress tree. Orpheus would give some shades a password to tell Hades's servants which would allow them to drink instead from the Mnemosyne (the pool of memory), which was located under a poplar tree. According to Statius, Lethe bordered Elysium, the final resting place of the virtuous. Ovid wrote that the river flowed through the cave of Hypnos, god of sleep, where its murmuring would induce drowsiness.

== Role in religion and philosophy ==
Some ancient Greeks believed that souls were made to drink from the river before being reincarnated, so that they would not remember their past lives. The Myth of Er in Book X of Plato's Republic tells of the dead arriving at a barren waste called the "plain of Lethe", through which the river Ameles ("careless") runs. It states that those who drank from the river would drink until they forgot everything unless they had been "saved by wisdom."

A few mystery religions taught the existence of another river, the Mnemosyne; those who drank from the Mnemosyne would remember everything and attain omniscience. Initiates were taught that they would receive a choice of rivers to drink from after death, and to drink from Mnemosyne instead of Lethe.

These two rivers are attested in several verse inscriptions on gold plates dating to the 4th century BC and onward, found at Thurii in Southern Italy and elsewhere throughout the Greek world. There were rivers of Lethe and Mnemosyne at the oracular shrine of Trophonius in Boeotia, from which worshippers would drink before making oracular consultations with the god. An Orphic inscription, said to be dated from between the second and third century B.C., warns readers to avoid the Lethe and to seek the Mnemosyne instead. Drinkers of the Lethe's water would not be quenched of their thirst, often causing them to drink more than necessary.

More recently, Martin Heidegger used "lēthē" to symbolize not only the "concealment of Being" or "forgetting of Being", but also the "concealment of concealment", which he saw as a major problem of modern philosophy. Examples are found in his books on Nietzsche (Vol 1, p. 194) and on Parmenides. Philosophers since, such as William J. Richardson have expanded on this school of thought.

== Real rivers ==
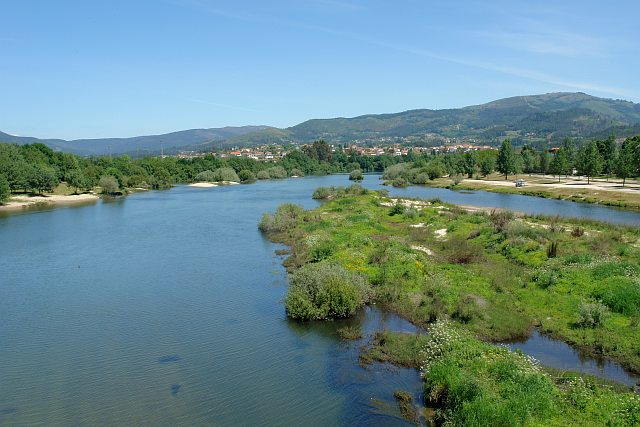
Lima Bridge on Lima River in Ponte de Lima, Portugal

According to Strabo, the Lima river, located between modern-day Norte Region, Portugal, and Galicia, Spain was also known as the River of Lethe in antiquity. The river got this name after an expedition made by a group of Celts and the Turduli during which they got into a disagreement and the Celts lost their chieftain (leader) causing them to scatter and settle in place. The river was also said to have the same properties of memory loss as the legendary Lethe River. In 138 BCE, the Roman general Decimus Junius Brutus Callaicus sought to dispose of the myth, as it impeded his military campaigns in the area. He was said to have personally crossed the Lima, and then called his soldiers from the other side, one by one, by name. The soldiers, astonished that their general remembered their names, crossed the river as well without fear. This act proved that the Lima was not as dangerous as the local myths described.

In Cádiz, Spain, the river Guadalete was originally named "Lethe" by local Greek and Phoenician colonists who, about to go to war, solved instead their differences by diplomacy and named the river Lethe to forever forget their former differences. When the Arabs conquered the region much later, their name for the river became Guadalete from the Arabic phrase وادي لكة (Wadi lakath) meaning "River of Forgetfulness".

In Alaska, a river which runs through the Valley of Ten Thousand Smokes is called the River Lethe. It is located within the Katmai National Park and Preserve in southwest Alaska. The name was inspired by the river from Greek mythology and chosen by R. F. Griggs in 1917.

== References in media ==
The Lethe has consistently appeared throughout media since ancient Greece through mediums such as music, art, and literature. Most known classical depictions of the Lethe come from literary sources from authors such as Virgil, Ovid, and Plato.

- Aristophanes references a plain of Lethe in his 405 BCE play The Frogs.
- Plato's Republic speaks to how those who drank from the Lethe forgot all their memories.
- In 29 BCE, Virgil wrote about Lethe in his didactic hexameter poem, the Georgics. Lethe is also referenced in Virgil's epic Latin poem, Aeneid, when the title protagonist travels to Lethe to meet the ghost of his father in Book VI of the poem.

The souls that throng the flood
Are those to whom, by fate, are other bodies ow'd:
In Lethe's lake they long oblivion taste,
Of future life secure, forgetful of the past.

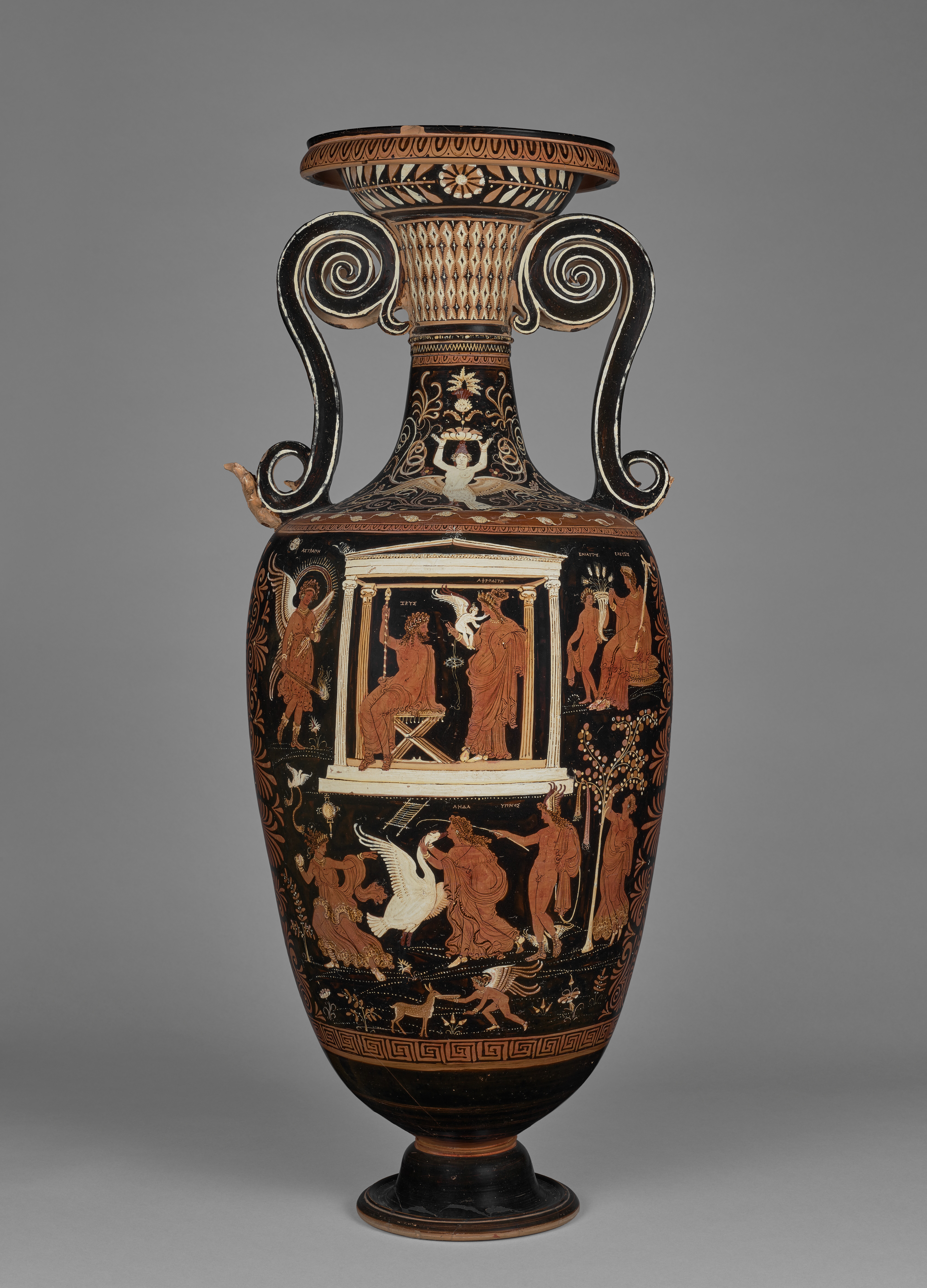
Apulian Red-Figure Loutrophoros, c. 330 BCE

- Ovid includes a description of Lethe as a stream that puts people to sleep in his work Metamorphoses (8 AD)
- In the Purgatorio, the second cantica of Dante Alighieri's Divine Comedy, the Lethe is located in the Earthly Paradise atop the Mountain of Purgatory. The piece, written in the early 14th century, tells of Dante's immersion in the Lethe so that his memories are wiped of sin (Purg. XXXI). The Lethe is also mentioned in the Inferno, the first part of the Comedy, as flowing down to Hell from Purgatory to be frozen in the ice around Satan, "the last lost vestiges of the sins of the saved" (Inf. XXXIV.130). He then proceeds to sip from the waters of the river Eunoe so that his soul may enter heaven full of the strength of his life's good deeds.
- William Shakespeare references Lethe's identity as the "river of forgetfulness" in a speech of the Ghost in Act 1 Scene 5 of Hamlet: "and duller should thoust be than the fat weed / That roots itself in ease on Lethe wharf," written sometime between 1599 and 1601. The Lethe is also referenced in Act 3 Scene 1 of Julius Caesar, where Antony says to Caesar's dead body, "Here didst thou fall; and here thy hunters stand, /Signed in thy spoil, and crimsoned in thy lethe."
- In John Milton's Paradise Lost, written in 1667, his first speech in Satan describes how "The associates and copartners of our loss, Lie thus astonished on the oblivious pool", referencing Lethe.
- The English poet John Keats references the river in poems "Ode to a Nightingale" and "Ode on Melancholy" written in 1819.
- In Faust, Part Two, the titular character, Faust, is bathed "in the dew of Lethe" so that he would forget what happened in Faust, Part One. A remorseful Faust would not work well with the rest of Part 2. The forgetting powers of Lethe allowed him to forget the ending of the Gretchen drama and move on to the story of part 2.
- The French poet Charles Baudelaire referred to the river in his poem "Spleen", published posthumously in 1869. The final line is "Où coule au lieu de sang l'eau verte du Léthé" which one translator renders as "... in whose veins flows the green water of Lethe ..." (the reference offers a few more English translations). Baudelaire also wrote a poem called "Lethe".

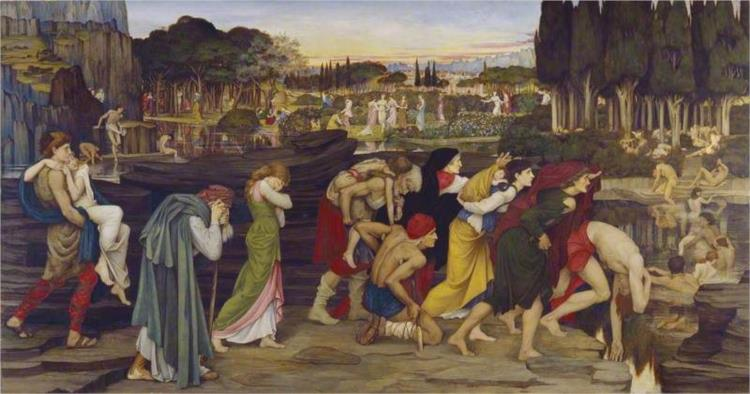
John Roddam Spencer Stanhope's The Waters of the Lethe by the Plains of Elysium.

=== Art ===
- A vase painting done around 330 BCE shows Hypnos, the personification of sleep, holding his staff that in myth is said to be dipped in the Lethe's waters.
- John Roddam Spencer Stanhope depicts a procession of individuals going to the Lethe in his 1880 painting The Waters of the Lethe by the Plains of Elysium.

== See also ==
- The Golden Bough (mythology)
- Meng Po – Goddess in Chinese mythology
