= Eunoe =

River in the Divine Comedy

Eunoe (Italian: Eunoè [eunoˈɛ]; Ancient Greek: Εὐνοη, romanized: Eúnoē) is a feature of Dante's Divine Comedy created by Dante as the fifth river of the dead (taking into consideration that Cocytus was described as a lake rather than a river). In the Purgatorio, the second cantica of Dante's poem, penitents reaching the Garden of Eden at the top of Mount Purgatory are first washed in the waters of the river Lethe in order to forget the memories of their mortal sins. They then pass through Eunoe to have the memories of their good deeds in life strengthened.

Upon completing one's sentence in Purgatory, a soul is washed in the rivers Lethe and Eunoe (in that order) by Matelda. It is unclear who Matelda was in real life, but, nonetheless, her function is to cause the penitent to forget their sins (now that these sins have been purged) and then sip from the waters of Eunoe so that the soul may enter heaven full of the strength of their life's good deeds.

In Purg. XXXIII, in the concluding lines of that canto and of the entire cantica, Dante makes particular reference to the dolce ber ("sweet draught") of Eunoe when he explains that he wished he possessed greater space to write of the water that "ne'er would satiate me."

The word "eunoe" is one of Dante's many neologisms presumably derived from Greek "eu-," meaning "good" and "noe," meaning "mind."

== See also ==
Other mythological rivers borrowed by Dante from Greek lore:

- Acheron, separating the Vestibule from Hell proper; Dante crosses with the help of Charon (Inf. III)
- Styx, the Fifth Circle, containing the Wrathful and the Sullen; Dante crosses in Phlegyas' skiff (Inf. VII-VIII)
- Phlegethon, the Seventh Circle, Ring 1, containing the Violent Against Others (Inf. XII)
- Cocytus, the Ninth Circle, the frozen lake of ice containing various traitors and, finally, Satan himself (Inf. XXXI-XXXIV)
- Lethe, in the Earthly Paradise atop the Mountain of Purgatory; Dante, held in the arms of Matelda, is immersed in the Lethe so that he may wipe out all memory of sin (Purg. XXXI). The Lethe it is mentioned in Inf. XXXIV.130 as flowing down to Hell to be frozen in the ice around Satan, "the last lost vestiges of the sins of the saved"

Eunoë is also the name of a nymph reported in Greek mythology; Eunoë
