= Girolamo Benivieni =

Italian poet

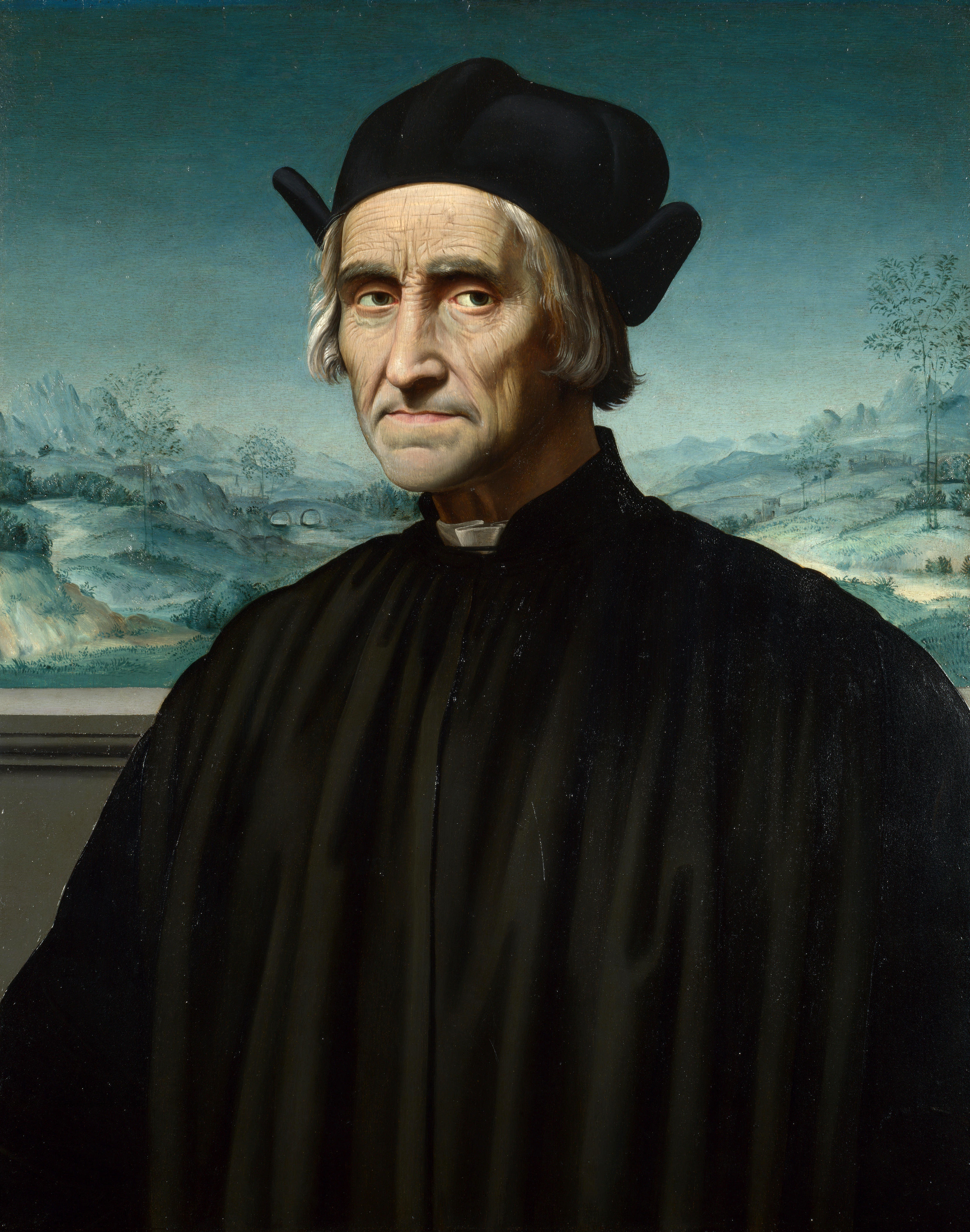
- Portrait of Benivieni at the National Gallery in London, painted between 1510 and 1520, and attributed to Ridolfo Ghirlandaio
- Born: 6 February 1453; Florence, Republic of Florence
- Died: August 1542 (aged 89); Florence, Duchy of Florence
- Occupation: Poet

Girolamo Benivieni (Italian: [dʒiˈrɔːlamo beniˈvjɛːni]; 6 February 1453 – August 1542) was a Florentine poet and a musician. His father was a notary in Florence. He suffered poor health most of his life, which prevented him from taking a more stable job. He was a leading member of the Medicean Academy, a society devoted to literary study. He was a friend of Giovanni Pico della Mirandola (1463–1494), whom he met for the first time in 1479; it was Pico della Mirandola who encouraged him to study Neoplatonism. In the late 1480s, he and Pico della Mirandola became students of Dominican friar Girolamo Savonarola (1452–1498). In 1496, he translated the teachings of Savonarola from Italian to Latin. After he began following Savonarola, he rejected his earlier poetry and attempted to write more spiritually. He participated in Savonarola's Bonfire of the Vanities, and documented the destruction of art worth "several thousand ducats".

He was supported in his writing by noblewoman Lucrezia de' Medici (1470–1553). They were both interested in the works of poet Dante Alighieri (1265–1321). In 1506, Benivieni published an edition of the Divine Comedy with maps by Antonio Manetti (1423–1497) and commentary by Manetti and Benivieni. In March 1515 Benivieni drafted a letter to be sent from Lucrezia to her brother, Pope Leo X (s. 1513–21), seeking his assistance in bringing the body of Dante back to Florence. On 20 October 1519, Benivieni signed a Medicean Academy petition to Pope Leo, again requesting the return of Dante from Ravenna. Benivieni also used his connection with Lucrezia to advance his ideas on church reform with her brother, and later with her cousin, Pope Clement VII (s. 1523–34). In 1530, he wrote a letter to Pope Clement in defense of Savonarola, seeking to have his reputation restored within the church. He is buried together with Giovanni Pico della Mirandola at San Marco, Florence, Italy.

He was a Christian Kabbalist and compiled a Hebrew-Latin dictionary.

== Sources ==
- Baldassarri, Stefano Ugo; Saiber, Arielle (2000). Images of Quattrocento Florence: Selected Writings in Literature, History and Art. Yale University Press. ISBN 978-0-300-08052-0.
- Cummings, Anthony M. (2004). "The Maecenas and the Madrigalist: Patrons, Patronage, and the Origins of the Italian Madrigal". Memoirs of the American Philosophical Society. 253. American Philosophical Society. ISBN 978-0-87169-253-5.
- Gardner, Edmund G. (1914). Introduction. A Platonick Discourse Upon Love. By Mirandola, Giovanni Pico della; Benivieni, Girolamo. Gardner, Edmund Garratt (ed.). Translated by Stanley, Thomas. Merrymount Press.
- Heilbron, John (2010). Galileo. Oxford: Oxford University Press. ISBN 978-0-19-958352-2.
- Tomas, Natalie R. (2003). The Medici Women: Gender and Power in Renaissance Florence. Aldershot: Ashgate. ISBN 0-7546-0777-1.
- Villari, Pasquale (1969). Life and Times of Girolamo Savonarola. Vol. 2. Translated by Villari, Linda. New York: Haskell House Publishers, Ltd. ISBN 0-8383-0174-6.
