= Antonio Manetti =

Italian mathematician and architect (1423–1497)

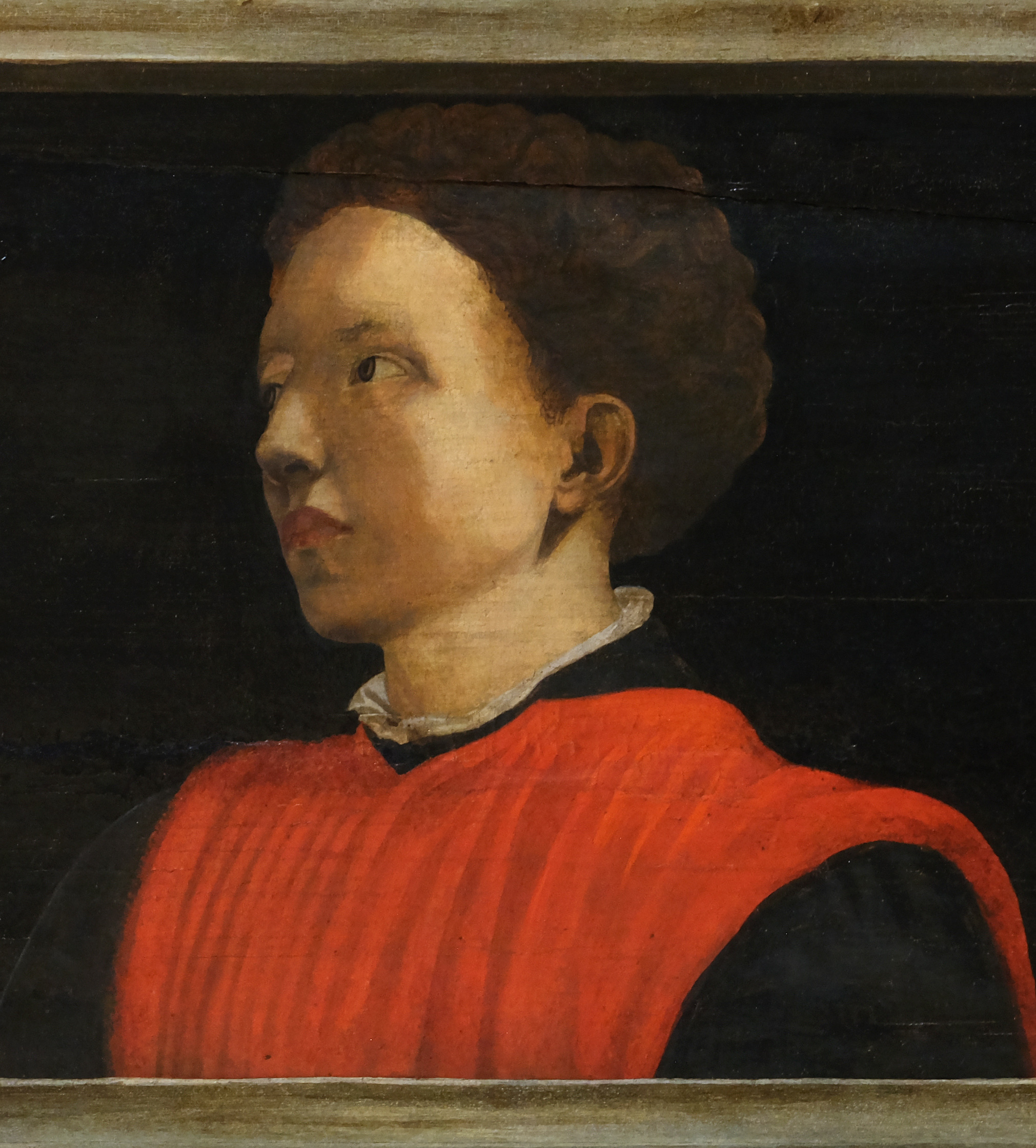
- Born: 6 July 1423; Florence, Italy
- Died: 26 May 1497 (aged 73); Florence, Italy
- Scientific career
- Fields: Architecture, Astronomy, Geography, Mathematics and Philosophy
- Notable students: Galileo Galilei

Antonio di Tuccio Manetti (6 July 1423 – May 26, 1497) was an Italian mathematician and architect from Florence. He is particularly noted for his investigations into the site, shape and size of Dante's Inferno. Although Manetti never himself published his research regarding the topic, the earliest Renaissance Florentine editors of the poem, Cristoforo Landino and Girolamo Benivieni, reported the results of his research in their respective editions of the Divine Comedy. Manetti is also famous for his short story, "The Fat Woodworker", which recounts a cruel practical joke devised by Brunelleschi. Furthermore, his supposed authorship of the biography of Filippo Brunelleschi has been widely discussed and analyzed. Manetti was further a member of the Arte di Por Santa Maria (also known as Arte della Seta), one of the seven Arti Maggiori guilds of Florence.

Born to a family of silk merchants, Manetti not only received an excellent education but was confronted with ample free time in which he was able to cultivate his many interests, which included mathematics, geometry, astronomy and philosophy.

== Private life ==
From the Parte Guelfa records, it becomes apparent that Manetti had 4 brothers, named Nezzo di Tuccio Marabottino, Lorenzo di Tuccio Marabottino, Marabottino di Tuccio di Marabottino and Benedetto di Tuccio Marabottino. Also present in the records is what seems like his grandson, Benedetto di Tuccio di Marabottino, which would indicate a marriage at some point in his life.

Much of what is known about Manetti's private life stems from the works of Milanesi; He writes that Manetti was named a Bonomini in 1470. He became a member of the Balìa a year later and in 1475 he became the Vicario of the Valdarno di Sopra. In 1476 he was one of the Priori and in 1481 he was Vicario of Valdinievole. In 1485 he was Gonfaloniere di Giustizia, and after that he served as Podestà of Colle di Val d'Elsa. He was among the civis et architectus working on the facade of S. Maria del Fiore in January 1491. His presence in the executive branch of the Florentinian government suggests that Manetti was well connected with influential thinkers of his time.

Recent documents also suggest that during 1466 Manetti was part of the operai of the Spedale degli Innocenti.

== Work ==
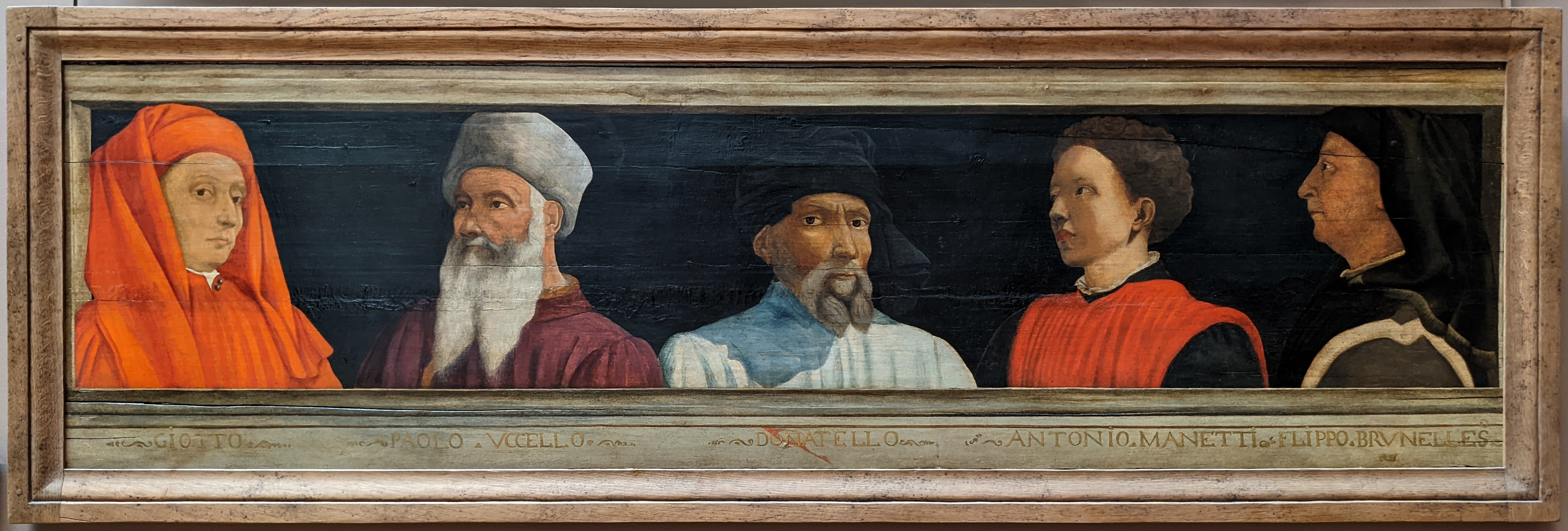
16th-century portrait of Florentine culture heroes: Giotto, Paolo Ucello, Donatello, Antonio Manetti, Brunelleschi

=== Biography of Filippo Brunelleschi ===
Of the vita of Filippo Brunelleschi three manuscripts have survived until modern time. They are called Magliabechiana (Magl.), Pistoiese (Pist.), and Corsiniana (Cor.).

==== Magliabechiana (Magl.) ====
Of the three, the Magliabechiana has received the most thorough attention. The first edited version by Canon Domenico Moreni was published in 1812 and attributed the work to an anonymous contemporary of Brunelleschi. The year 1887 brought the publication of three new publications of the work.

The first, and simultaneously best known edition, was edited by Gaetano Milanesi who attributed the handwriting to Manetti. Milanesi also contemporized the orthography in his edition which has led to critique of his work.

Another edition of the Maggliabechiana was edited by Carl Frey in 1887 and was intended to be used in lectures. In comparison with other editions, this has been called the closest translation of the original document. Frey mentions that Milanesi attributed the authorship of the document to Manetti, however he remains critical of the truth of this statement.

The third publication was an edited version of Moreni's translation by Heinrich Holtzinger which attributes the work to Manetti, citing Milanesi as his source. Holtzinger states as the reason for this re-publication the rarity of Moreni's version in German bookstores. Holtzinger also states that his version was first created without access to the original document and only in the late stages was it possible to compare his version with the document and refer to deviations in his appendix.

==== Pistoiese (Pist.) ====
This text was discovered and edited by Alessandro Chiappelli. The publication in 1896 provided additional information regarding some of Brunnelleschi's work, however, Chiappelli has been criticized for working not with the original Magliabechiana but with Milanesi's publication for the first part of his work. Elena Toesca published another edition in 1927, using both a re-edited version of Milanesi's edition and copying Chiappelli's work.

This version of the manuscript leaves out the first part of the Vita and continues where the Magl. abruptly stops.

==== Corsiniana (Cor.) ====
This manuscript has not been published and is not well known. Although it shares its first and last sentence with the Pistoiese manuscript, it is written in different handwritings and thus can not be attributed to one author.

===== Authorship and date =====
Although the authorship and the dating of the documents has been subject to scholarly debate, most agree that the document was written by Antonio Manetti before 1497. Cornel von Fabriczy has attempted a more accurate dating than the death of Manetti and set the work in the 1480s. He presents as his evidence the past tense use regarding Paolo dal Pozzo Toscanelli, who died in 1482. He also states that the work had to be finished before 1489, as some changes to one of the buildings of Brunelleschi were made in that year and not recorded in the biography.

When it comes to authorship of the Magliabechiana, the debate starts with the question of whether the Magl. is an original document or merely a copy. While Moreni and Milanesi agree that the Magl. is indeed the original document, only Frey offers evidence on this conclusion. The reason for the importance of this debate is, that the evidence of the authorship of the document that Milanesi presents, is based on the handwriting of the document. Subsequently, if the document is merely a copy and not the original, Manetti is not the original author of the Magl. It is further important that Milanesi attributes the handwriting of the document to Manetti on the basis of Manetti's work "the fat woodworker". This has led to critique, as Manetti is known for making copies of other works such as Ficino's translation of "Dante's Monarchy". Another part of the critique is that the work differs from other writing attributed to Manetti, both in length and style.

The absence of corrections in the text has led to both arguments for and against it being a copy. It has also been attributed to a fluent style of writing which was practiced frequently by Florentinian humanists. Although no final conclusion can be drawn, Manetti's handwriting was found under a pasted-over piece of paper, negating much of the evidence for a copy based on the absence of corrections.

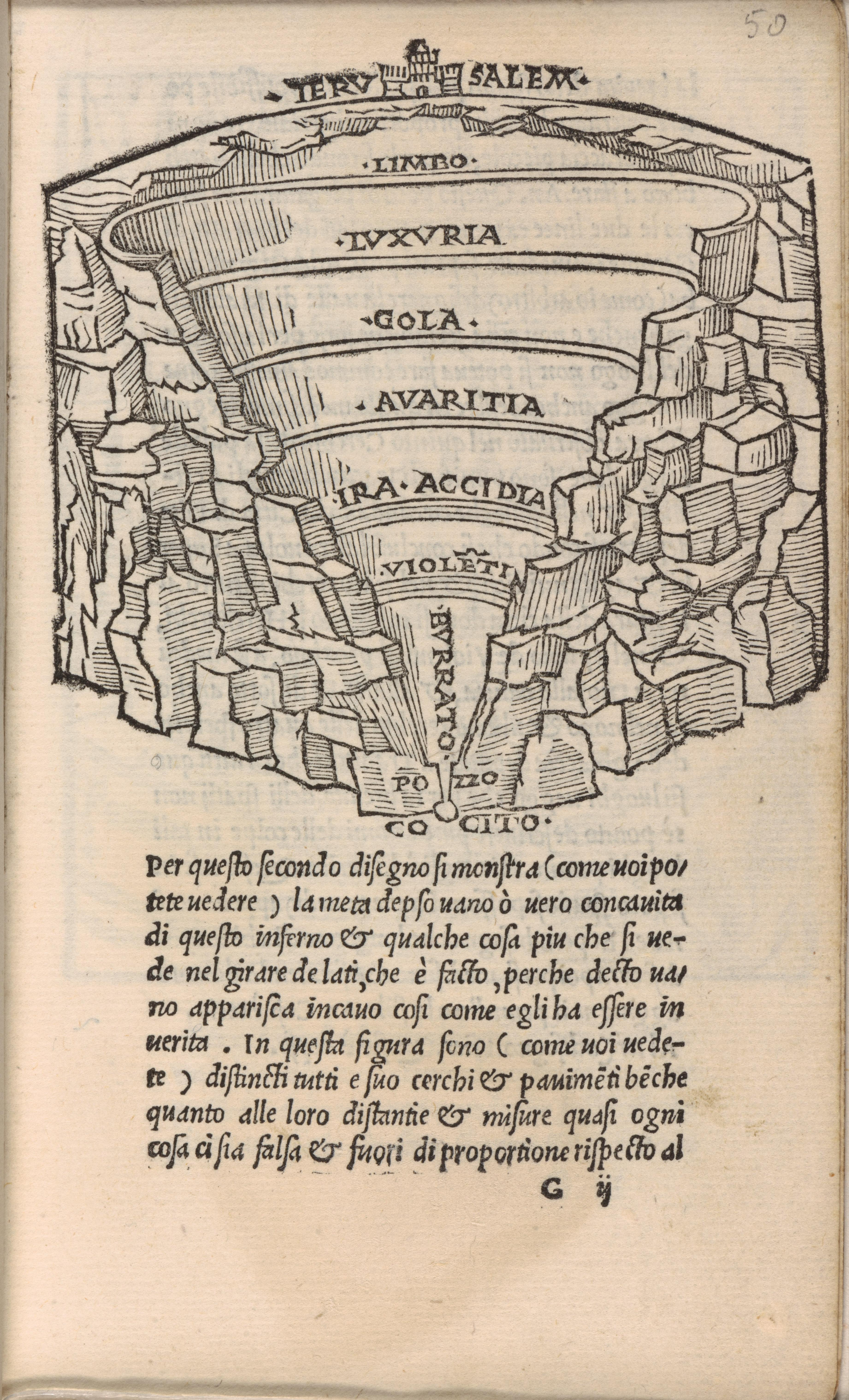
Manetti Overview of Hell

=== Dante's Inferno ===
Although Dante described his Inferno, the specifics of his architecture are left to the imagination of his fellow thinkers, which has led to various versions of the Inferno. Manetti's version of Dante's Inferno gained attention through Galileo Galilei and his lectures regarding Dante's inferno in 1588. In these lectures, Galileo compared the shape, location and size of proposed Infernos by Antonio Manetti and Alessandro Vellutello of Lucca. The reasoning behind Galileo's favoritism towards Manetti's work can be traced towards a political conflict with Vellutello's hometown of Lucca. During a previous military conflict between the two places in 1430, Filipo Brunelleschi had suggested to re-route a river in order to isolate Lucca and force a surrender to the siege. However, this had failed spectacularly with the flooding of the Florentinian's own camp and led to the humiliation of not only Brunelleschi but the whole of Florence.

Manetti's Inferno consists of a cone-shaped region, the vertex of which is centred and its base centred on Jerusalem. Manetti proposes a direct line from the center of the Earth, simultaneously the heaviest part of the universe, to Jerusalem. An arc extends from Jerusalem over the Earth and water to a twelfth part of its circumference. One end of this arc will touch Jerusalem, while the other end of this arc will be connected to the center of the earth by a straight line. These two straight lines will form the sector of a circle, which if moved in a circle and cutting through the Earth would reveal a cone like hole; the Inferno.

Manetti's levels of the Inferno are arranged regularly, being 1/8 of the Earth's circumference apart between each level. Galileo calculated that this would lead to a diameter of 405 miles of the cone at its surface and with that being much larger in size than Vellutello's Inferno.

Manetti himself never published his investigation into Dante's inferno, his findings were instead published by Girolamo Benevieni in his Dialogo de Antonio Manetti.

=== The Fat Woodworker ===
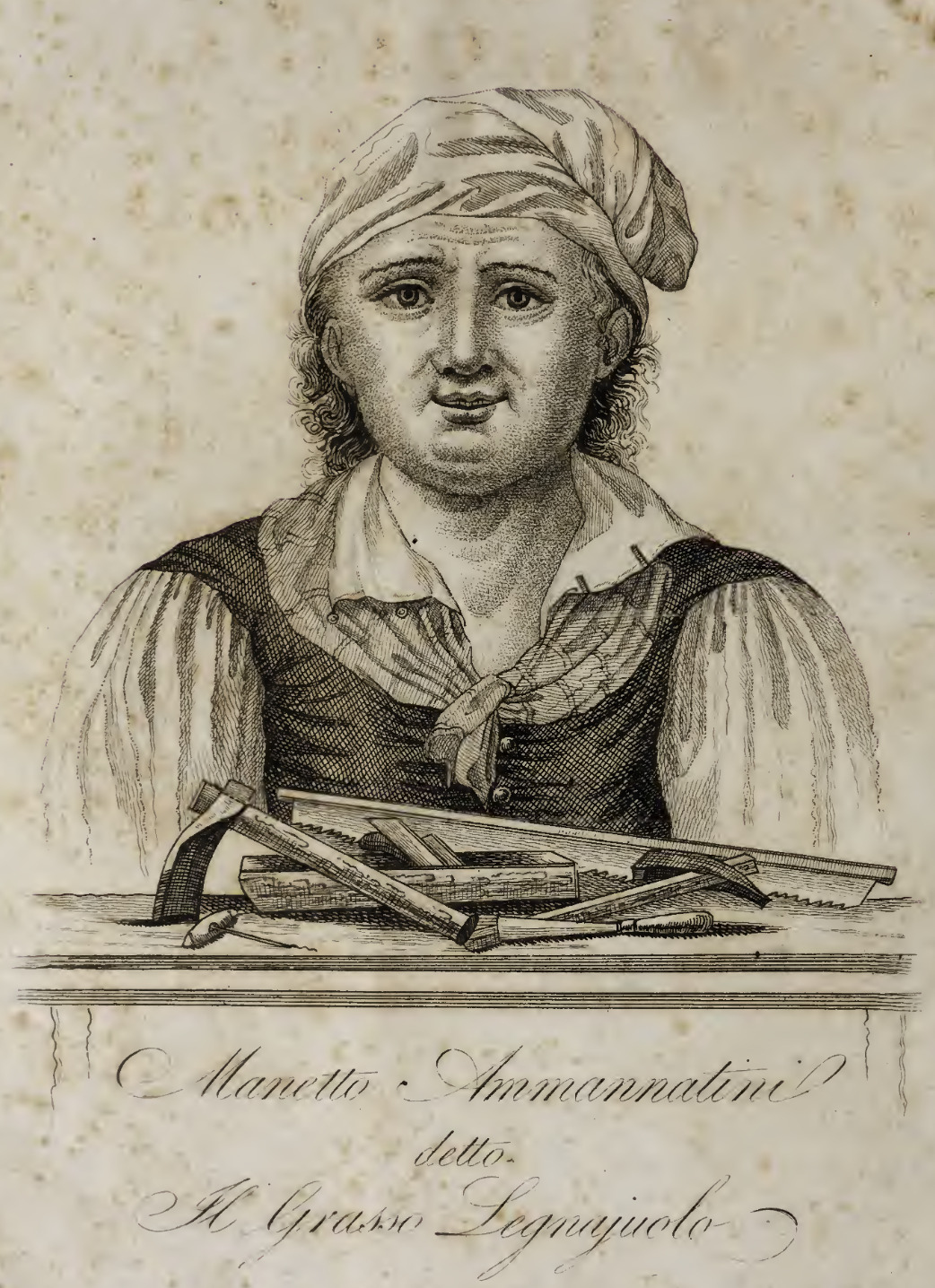
The Fat Woodworker

The Fat Woodworker or Fat Woodcarver (IT.: Novella del Grasso Legnajulo) is a humorous story in the beffe tradition. It tells the tale of a cruel and juvenile prank played on a woodworker named Manetto by Filipo Brunelleschi.

The story is set in the year 1409 in Florence around influential men of the public life. The tale introduces the reader to the social scene of artists and artisanal workers in Florence, while setting up Brunelleschi as a questionable hero. These men often eat dinner together, but one night a woodworker named Manetto is absent from the group. The men interpret this as a slight by Manetto, who is described as having a simple mind. The men decide to play a prank on Manetto as a punishment for his refusal of the dinner invitation. Filipo Brunelleschi comes up with the idea to convince Manetto that he has become another person, after convincing the other men that he is simple enough to believe this.

Brunelleschi goes about his plan and is able to convince Manetto that he has indeed become another person. The story follows Manetto's internal confusion while focusing on the psychological aspects of the prank on the woodworker. At the end of the story, Manetto goes to Hungary and comes back to Florence on several occasions. He has gained a deeper understanding of the meaning of self and even smiles when Brunelleschi finally reveals himself as the mastermind some years later. Instead of focusing on the cruelty of the joke, the story focuses on how the prank has benefitted Manetto.

=== Zibaldone ===
The Zibaldone Manetti is a collection of writings by Antonio Manetti's hand, which are attributed to other authors. It can be found in the National Library in Florence and includes works like The Book of Archandreo by Gherardi di Cremona, Immago Mundia, Della Imagine del Mondo di Santo Isidero, De Origine Civitas Florentinae by Filippo Vilani, The Life of Charlemagne by Donato Acciaiuolo.

The works show the wide reaching interests of Manetti, which span from architecture to astronomy and the arts to mathematics, geography, and Dante.

== Gallery ==
Dante's Divine Comedy by Antonio Manneti

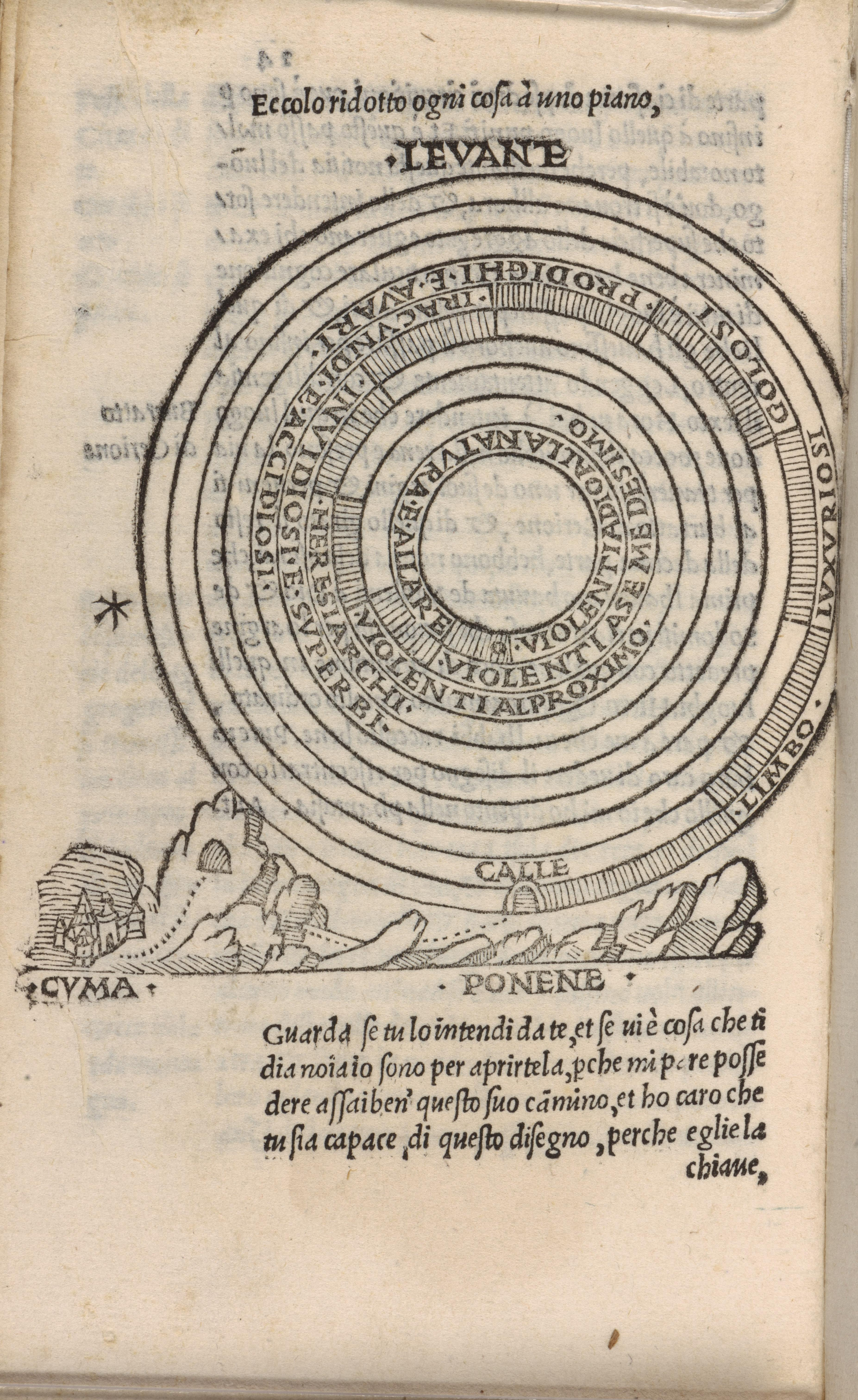
Everything Reduced to One Plan, 1506

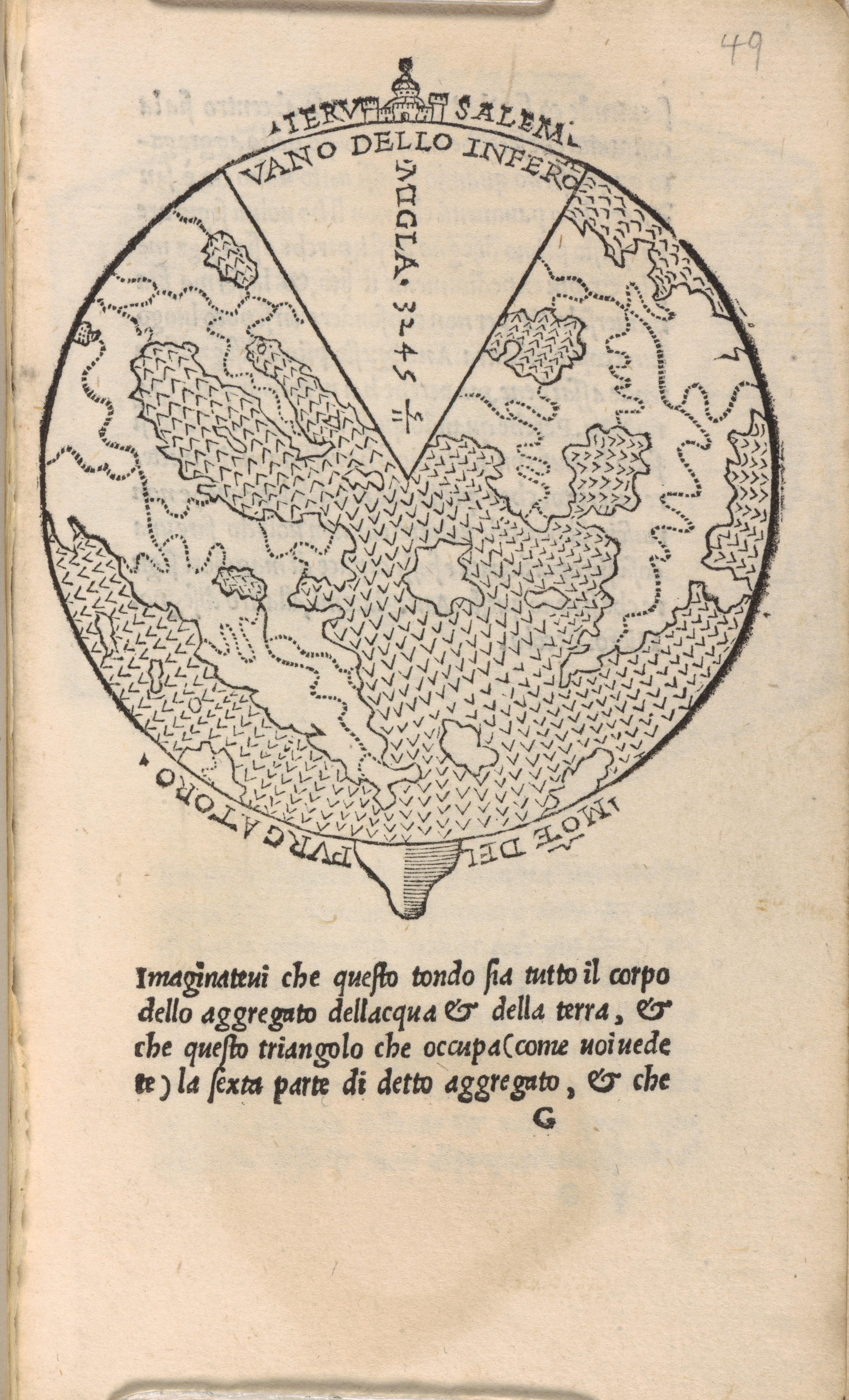
The Chamber of Hell, 1506

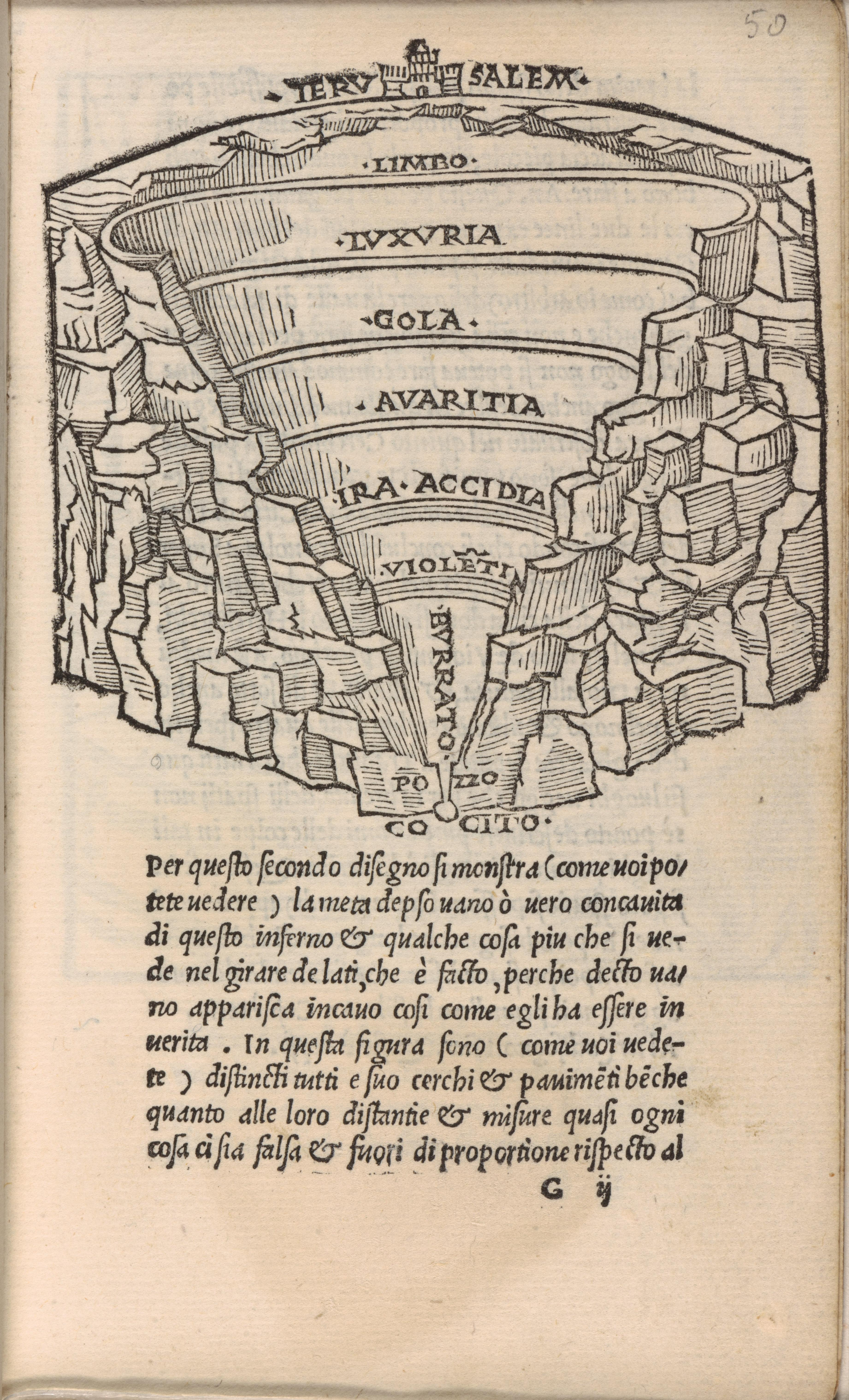
Overview of Hell, 1506

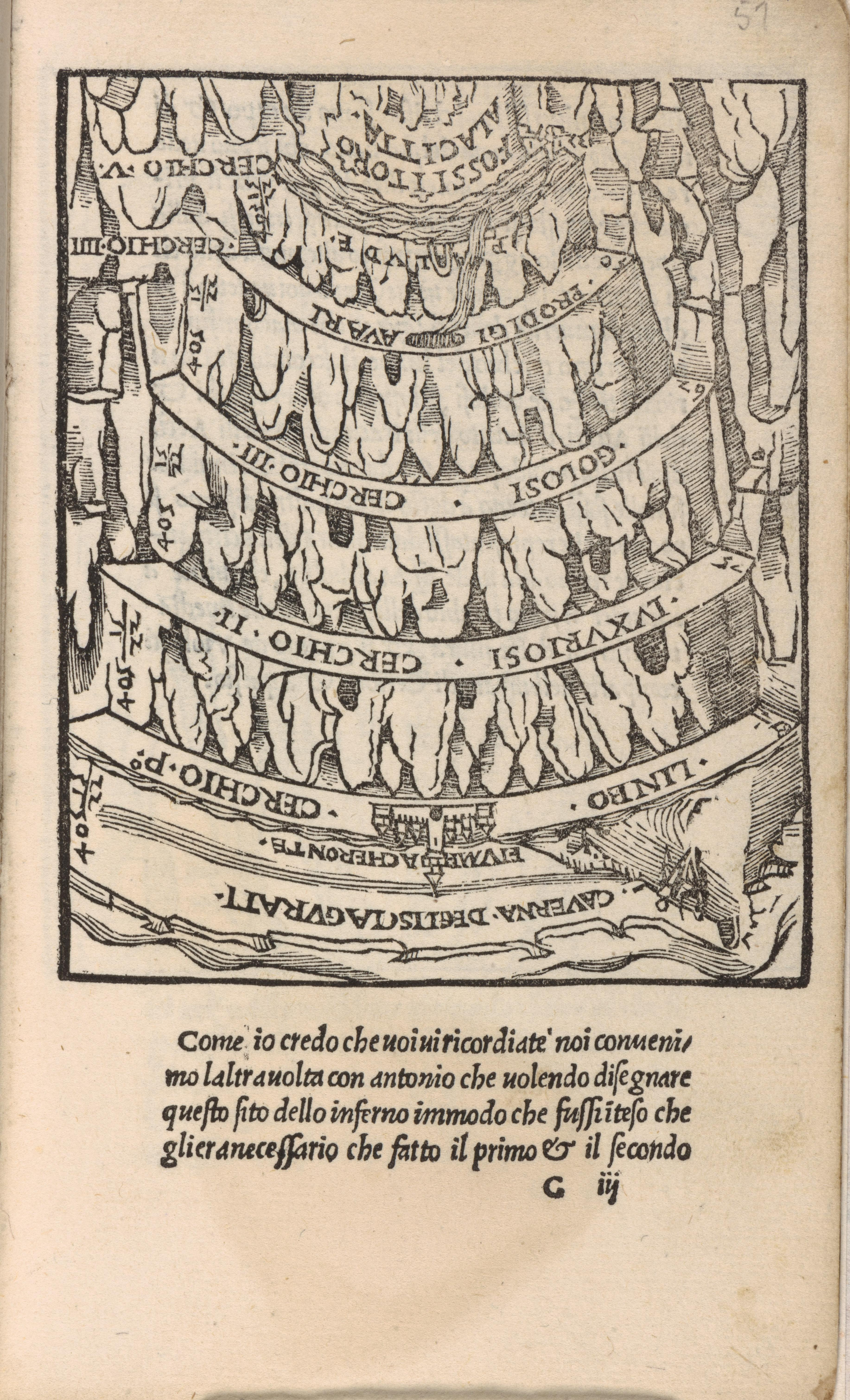
The First Five Circles, 1506

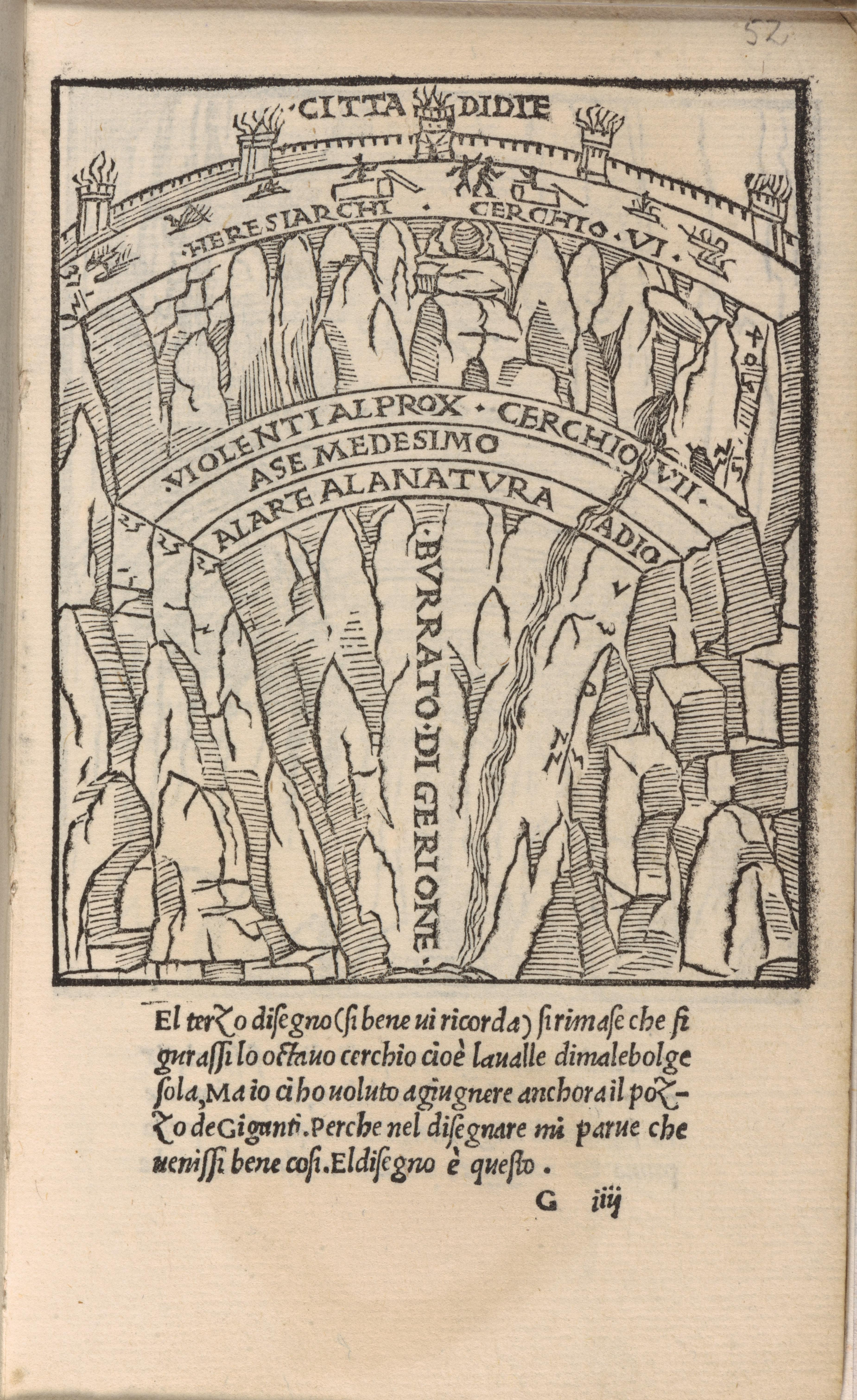
Circles Six and Seven, 1506

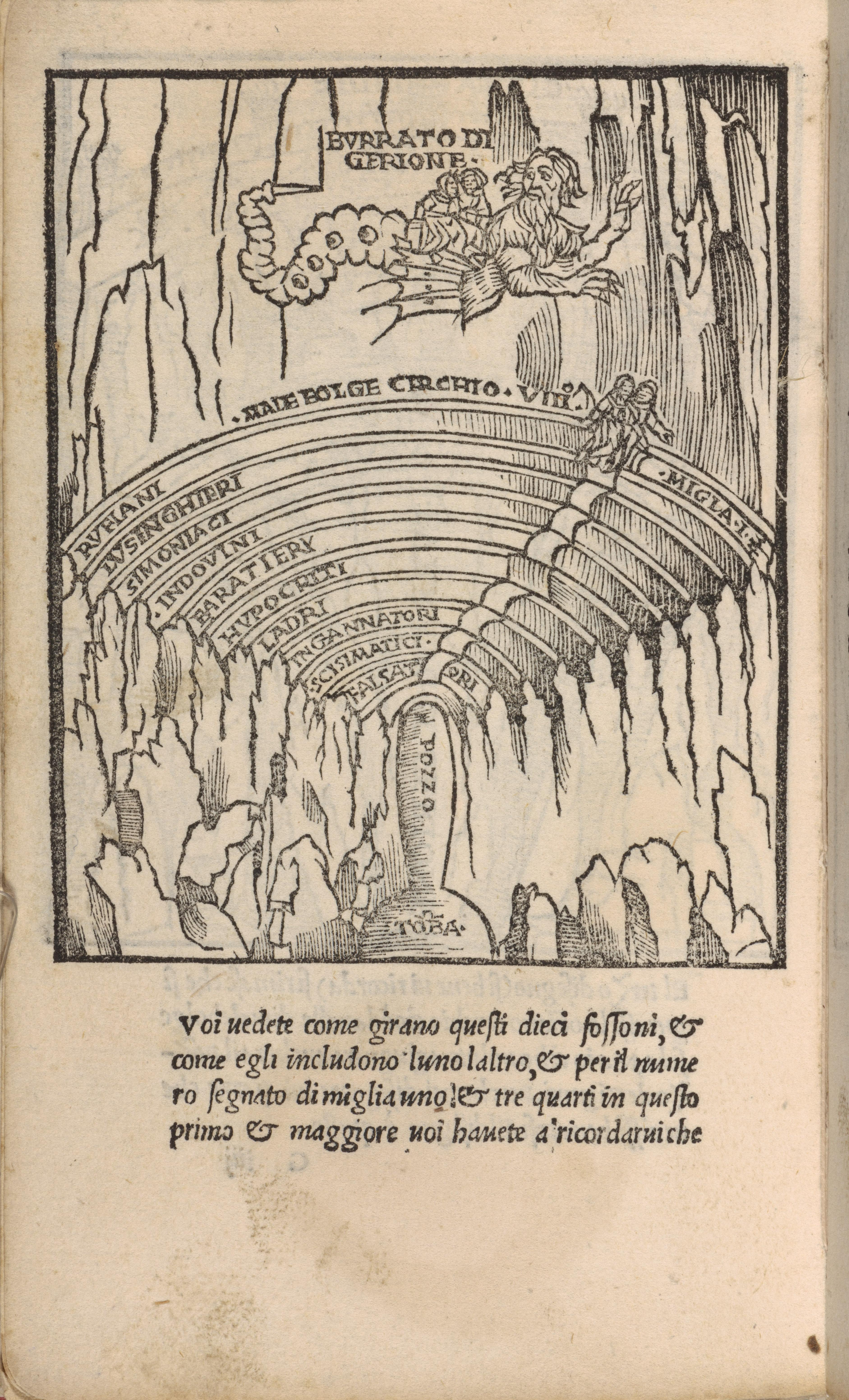
The Lair of Geryon, 1506

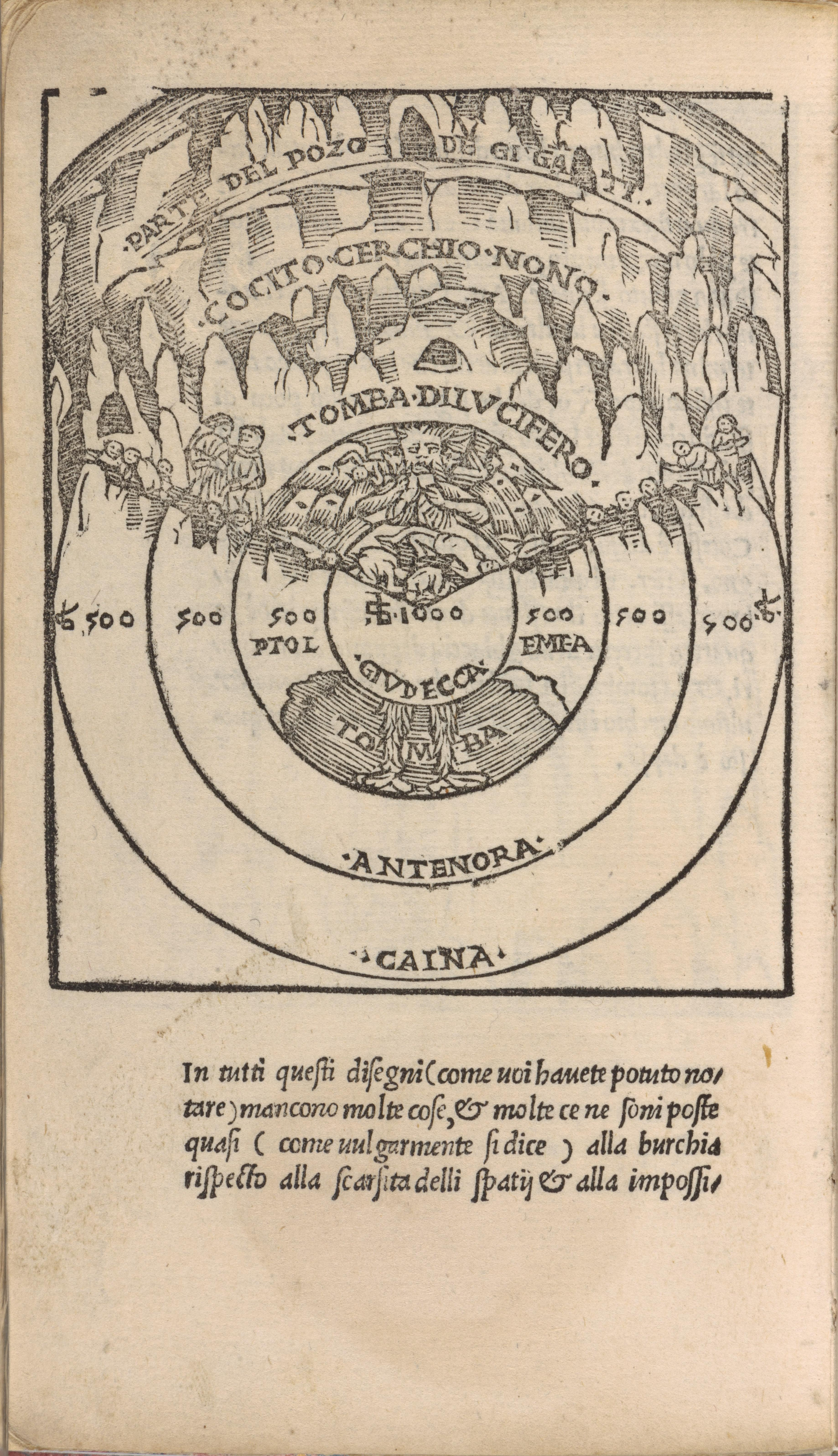
The Tomb of Lucifer, 1506

Media related to Antonio Manetti at Wikimedia Commons
