= Cavalcante (name) =

Cavalcante is a surname of Italian origin meaning 'to ride', derived from the medieval personal name Cavalcare, in turn derived from Latin caballicare. Notable people with the surname include:

== Surname ==
- Anthony Cavalcante (1897–1966), American politician
- Cris (footballer, born 2002) (full name Miriam Cristina Cavalcante), Brazilian footballer
- Danilo Cavalcante (born 1989), Brazilian murderer and prison escapee
- Dedé (footballer, born 1987) (full name Derivaldo Beserra Cavalcante), Brazilian footballer
- Djalma Cavalcante (born 1957), Brazilian football player and coach
- Edson Pinheiro (full name Edson Cavalcante Pinheiro; born 1979), Brazilian Paralympic athlete
- Gesias Cavalcante (born 1983), Brazilian mixed martial artist
- Goiano (footballer, born 1935) (full name Clenílton Ataíde Cavalcante), Brazilian footballer
- Janaína (footballer) (full name Janaína Queiroz Cavalcante; born 1988), Brazilian footballer
- Lucão (footballer, born 1996) (full name Lucas Cavalcante Silva Afonso), Brazilian footballer
- Manoel Victor Cavalcante (1958–2022), Brazilian politician
- Nando (footballer, born 1990) (full name Fernando Henrique Quintela Cavalcante), Brazilian footballer
- Rafael Cavalcante (born 1980), Brazilian mixed martial artist
- Raphael Veiga (full name Raphael Cavalcante Veiga; born 1995), Brazilian footballer
- Rebecca Cavalcante (born 1993), Brazilian beach volleyball player
- Ricardinho (footballer, born September 1989) (full name Ricardo Cavalcante Mendes), Brazilian footballer
- Ricardo (footballer, born 1977) (full name Ricardo Cavalcante Ribeiro), Brazilian footballer
- Sóstenes Cavalcante (born 1975), Brazilian politician and pastor
- Spok (real name Inaldo Cavalcante de Albuquerque; fl. 1984–present), Brazilian saxophone player
- Tom Cavalcante (born 1962), Brazilian actor and comedian

== Given name ==
- Cavalcante de' Cavalcanti (died c. 1280), Italian philosopher

== See also ==
- Cavalcante, a town in Goiás, Brazil
- Joyce Cavalccante (born 1963), Brazilian author
- DeCavalcante crime family, a crime family in northern New Jersey
- Cavalcanti, a surname and variant of Cavalcante
