= Cavalcanti =

Cavalcanti is an Italian surname. Notable people and characters with the surname include:

- Alberto Cavalcanti (1897–1982), Brazilian film director
- Andrea Cavalcanti, fictional character in The Count of Monte Cristo by Alexandre Dumas
- Cavalcante de' Cavalcanti (died c. 1280), Florentine philosopher, father of Guido Cavalicanti
- Emiliano Di Cavalcanti (1897–1976), Brazilian painter
- Flávio Cavalcanti (1923–1986), Brazilian radio and television presenter, journalist, songwriter and music critic
- Giovanni Cavalcanti (chronicler) (1381–c. 1451), Florentine chronicler
- Giovanni Cavalcanti (poet) (1444–1509), Florentine poet
- Guido Cavalcanti (c. 1255–1300), Italian poet
- Humberto Cavalcanti de Albuquerque Teixeira (1915–1979), Brazilian lawyer, politician, musician, and composer
- Jacqueline Cavalcanti (born 1997), Portuguese mixed martial artist
- João Pessoa Cavalcanti de Albuquerque (1878–1930), Brazilian politician
- Joaquim Arcoverde de Albuquerque Cavalcanti (1850–1930), Brazilian prelate, first Latin American Cardinal
- Severino Cavalcanti (1930–2020), Brazilian politician

== See also ==
- Cavalcante (name), a similar surname
