= Sixtus of Esztergom =

Hungarian clergyman

Sixtus
- Lector of Esztergom
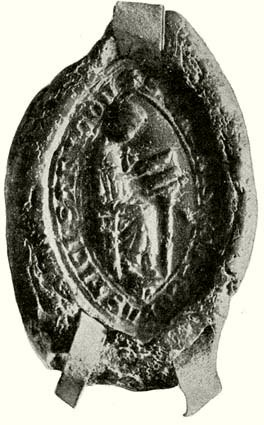
- Seal of lector Sixtus from 1272
- Successor: Cyprian

Personal details
- Born: c. 1220
- Died: 1285 or 1286 (aged c. 65)

Sixtus (Hungarian: Sükösd or Sike; c. 1220 – 1285 or 1286) was a Hungarian clergyman in the 13th century, who served as a skilled diplomat of King Béla IV of Hungary for decades.

== Early life ==
Sixtus was presumably born around 1220 (Note: The assumption of Sixtus' biographer Péter Kis; in 1215 new rules were issued in the University of Paris, governing who could become a magister. To teach the arts, a candidate had to be at least twenty-one, to have studied these arts at least six years, and to take an engagement as professor for at least two years.) into a lower noble family, which possessed lands and fields in Hetény (today Chotín in Slovakia). His permanent honorary title of "magister" demonstrates his university degree (possibly he studied in Sorbonne or other Paris-type cathedral schools, gaining rhetorical and legal erudition). In contemporary records, he is first referred to as a cleric by Pope Innocent IV on 20 February 1245, when he authorized papal legate Giacomo da Pecorara to permit Sixtus' consecration and to grant him the right of possession of church benefices despite his "lack of origin". The document says Sixtus was the son of a lowborn priest. Sixtus had a sister Joanna, who married Lawrence, a landowner in Szőllős (today Vinodol, Nitra). Their marriage produced several children. His other brother-in-law Ampud of Macsala was also a landowner in Hetény. Through the paternal branch, he was related to Mikó Szécs, a courtier in Esztergom.

== Ecclesiastical career ==
Historian Péter Kis assumes Sixtus was identical with a namesake cleric who is mentioned as a cantor of the Győr Chapter by four charters in the period between 1241 and 1248. He also argues Sixtus functioned as dean of Pressburg Chapter in 1253. Sixtus is first referred to as lector of the Esztergom Chapter in 1255. Through his extensive kinship in Esztergom County, he could compensate his nuclear family's relatively low origin. Besides his duty to proclaim the Scripture readings used in the Liturgy of the Word, Sixtus was responsible for management of the cathedral school of Esztergom and teaching the clerics and the poor scholars, in accordance with Canon 18 of the Third Council of the Lateran (1179). Thus he was also styled as "scholasticus" in contemporary documents. Additionally, Sixtus led the local place of authentication in this capacity. Approximately thirty charters remain from Sixtus' term. For this role, Charles I of Sicily referred to him as "chancellor of Esztergom" (Latin: cancellarius Strigoniensis) in 1270. Sixtus occasionally also used this title thereafter.

Sixtus resigned as lector, when he was sent as head of the Hungarian diplomatic mission to Rome, from 1258 to 1264. Then he became archdeacon of Komárom (present-day Komárno, Slovakia). On 15 July 1264, Pope Urban IV ordered Vincent, Bishop of Nyitra (or Nitra) to provide a dignity and benefice for Sixtus either in Zagreb or other cathedrals, or perhaps in a church of the Archdiocese of Esztergom, because he "wants to leave" his position of archdeacon in Komárom (probably due to its extensive administrative obligations). After 1266, Sixtus returned to his office of lector in Esztergom. In August 1271, after Ottokar II of Bohemia invaded the lands north of the Danube and destroyed the archives of the Diocese of Nyitra (Nitra), vice-ispán Michael, Benedict, provost of Arad and Sixtus were mandated by King Stephen V to determine the borders of the diocese, cataloging its estates and churches upon the request of Bishop Vincent. In early 1272, Sixtus appeared as an ad litem judge to investigate the credibility of the udvarnik lands countrywide. In this capacity, he traveled the counties of Veszprém, Zala, Somogy and Vas.

He last appears in contemporary sources on 17 April 1285. A certain Cyprian succeeded him as lector of Esztergom by 15 August 1286, suggesting Sixtus was deceased by then. In 1287, he is referred to as of "good memory" (bone memorie). Sixtus made his last will and testament in 1272, along with cantor Valentine. Accordingly, his gifted lands in Hetény was inherited by the Archdiocese of Esztergom. Sixtus stipulated that the archbishop had to finish the construction of the St. Anne monastery in the area. The monastery later belonged to the Williamites.

== Diplomatic missions ==
Both Urban IV in 1264 and Charles of Sicily in 1270 referred to Sixtus as a "royal cleric", which connected his diplomatic activity. At first, he was sent to Italy in 1258 to represent King Béla's interests at the Roman Curia, as some of his policies gave rise to many conflicts between the Hungarian royal court and the Holy See after the Mongol invasion. Sixtus sold some part of his inherited land in Hetény to his relative and neighbour Mikó Szécs, in order to finance his diplomatic mission to Rome. He stayed there as the permanent ambassador of the Kingdom of Hungary to the Papal States until 1264. For instance, Sixtus protested in the name of his king when Pope Urban IV appointed Timothy as Bishop of Zagreb without Béla's consultation in late 1263. At the same time, the king was angered by the fact too that Pope Urban allowed his opponent Cardinal Báncsa to be free to distribute Timothy's benefices in Hungary among his relatives. When the reconciliation of Béla and his rebellious son Duke Stephen proved to be only temporary in 1263, the king commissioned Sixtus to convince the pope to support Béla's interests and withdraw support from some pro-Stephen Hungarian prelates. For his loyal service, Sixtus was granted royal land donations from his monarch and spouse Queen Maria Laskarina in Hetény and Radvány (present-day Radvaň nad Dunajom, Slovakia) after returning home, when the civil war broke out. According to the narratios of three of Béla's donation letters, "[Sixtus] protected us and the right of our crown for many years". For his merits, Sixtus was also appointed as titular papal chaplain by Pope Urban after 1264. During the years spent in Rome, his envoy companion was a certain Egidius from the Diocese of Győr.

In 1270, Sixtus was among the members of the Hungarian delegation presumably led by magister Ákos sent to Naples which escorted the then twelve-year-old princess Mary to marry Charles the Lame. Before that he sold another part of Hetény for 70 silver coins to Mikó Szécs. For Charles of Anjou, Hungary was an important ally, when he forged alliances in the Balkan Peninsula to counteract the surrounding great powers, the Byzantine Empire and the Republic of Venice. Charles' three documents mention Sixtus' stay in the Sicilian royal court at the end of 1270. Charles sent his notary Reginald of Florence as Sixtus' accompaniment. The diplomat returned to Hungary by June 1271. Historian Jenő Szűcs argued chronicler Simon of Kéza belonged to Sixtus' familia and also took part in the diplomatic mission, along with Master Andrew.

== Sources ==
- Kis, Péter (2002). ""Sok éven át védett minket és koronánk jogait": Sixtus esztergomi olvasókanonok karrierje ["He Protected Us and Right of Our Crown for Many Years": The Career of Sixtus, Lector of Esztergom]" (PDF). Fons. 9 (1–3). Szentpétery Imre Történettudományi Alapítvány: 7–27. ISSN 1217-8020.
- Tóth, Krisztina (2011). "A Szécs nemzetség és rokoni kapcsolatai [The Szécs kindred and its Family Relationships]" (PDF). Turul (in Hungarian). 84 (2): 37–42.
- Szűcs, Jenő (1999). "Theoretical Elements in Master Simon of Kéza's Gesta Hungarorum (1282–1285)". In László Veszprémy; Frank Schaer (eds.). Simon of Kéza: Deeds of the Hungarians. Central European University Press. pp. xxix–cii.
- Zsoldos, Attila (2000). "Az Árpádok követei [The Envoys of the Árpáds]". In Piti, Ferenc; Szabados, György (eds.). "Magyaroknak eleiről". Ünnepi tanulmányok a hatvan esztendős Makk Ferenc tiszteletére (in Hungarian). Szegedi Középkorász Műhely. p. 703–714. ISBN 963-482-500-1.
