= Giovanni Cavalcanti =

Giovanni Cavalcanti may refer to:

- Giovanni Cavalcanti (chronicler) (1381–c. 1451), chronicler of Florence
- Giovanni Cavalcanti (cyclist) (born 1943), Italian cyclist
- Giovanni Cavalcanti (poet) (1444–1509), Italian poet from Florence
