= Guido Cavalcanti =

Italian poet (c. 1250/1259–1300)

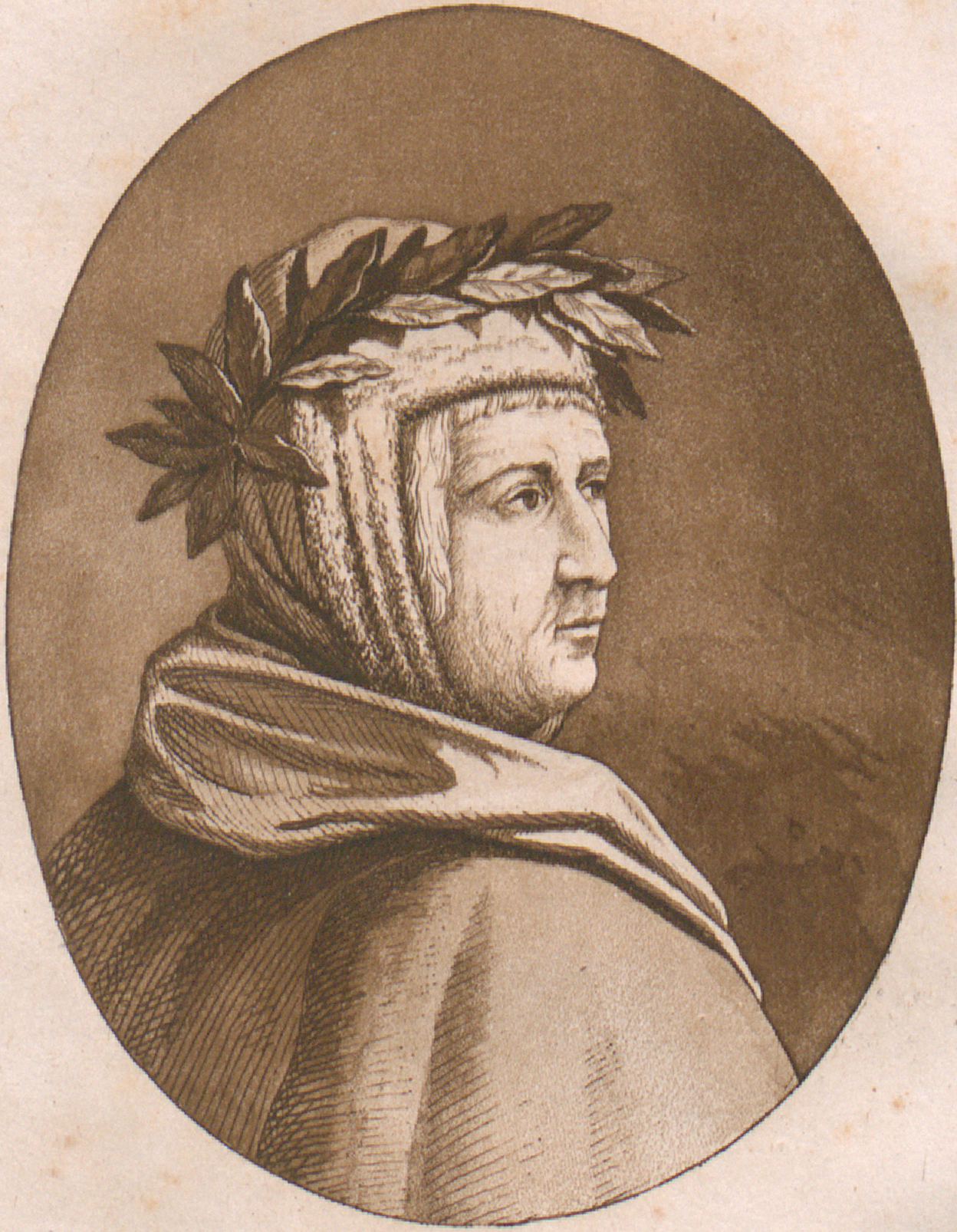
Cavalcanti's portrait, in Rime di Guido Cavalcanti (1813)

Guido Cavalcanti (between 1250 and 1259 – August 1300) was an Italian poet. He was Dante Alighieri's 'best friend', as well as one of his most notable intellectual influences.

== Historical background ==
Cavalcanti was born in Florence at a time when the comune was beginning its economic, political, intellectual and artistic ascendancy into one of the most influential cities of the Renaissance. The disunited Italian peninsula was dominated by a political particularism that pitted city-states against one another, with this factionalism often contributing to the fractious and sometimes violent political environments of each comune. The domination of medieval religious interpretations of reality, morality and society was challenged by the rise of a new urban culture across Europe that gradually supplanted rural, local, ecclesiastical and feudal ways of thinking. There was an accompanying return to study, and to interpretation and emulation of the classics, known as a revival of antiquity. New secular and humanistic views laid the foundations for modern life in Western Civilization. As Jacob Burckhardt, Swiss historian and author of The Civilization of the Renaissance in Italy wrote, "It was not the revival of antiquity alone, but its union with the genius of the Italian people which achieved the conquest of the western world." Cavalcanti lived during and helped shape this time of great innovation that was spurred on by a desire to explore, create and experiment with new things.

== The politics of Florence ==
Cavalcanti was the son of Cavalcante de' Cavalcanti, a Guelph whom Dante condemns to the sixth circle of his Inferno, where the heretics are punished. It is possible that, unlike Dante, Guido Cavalcanti was an atheist, sharing in his father's Epicurean philosophy. Giovanni Boccaccio (Decameron, VI, 9) wrote, over half a century after Cavalcanti's death, "Si diceva tralla gente volgare che queste sue speculazioni erano solo in cercare se trovar si potesse che Iddio non-fosse" (People commonly said these speculations of his only regarded whether one could discover that God does not exist).

During his lifetime, Florence was politically torn by the struggle between the Guelphs and Ghibellines, factions supporting, respectively, the Pope and the Holy Roman Emperor in central and northern Italy during the 12th and 13th centuries. Although the struggle for power between the Papacy and the Holy Roman Empire had originally arisen with the Investiture Conflict of the 11th century, it was subsequently fed by a desire of either the Papacy or Holy Roman Emperor either to share in or to control the economic boom that was taking place in the leading cities of northern Italy during this time.

The division between Guelphs and Ghibellines was especially important in Florence, although the two sides frequently rebelled against each other and took power in many of the other northern Italian cities as well. Essentially, the two sides were now fighting either against German influence (in the case of the Guelphs), or against the temporal power of the Pope (in the case of the Ghibellines). In Florence and elsewhere the Guelphs usually included merchants and burghers, while the Ghibellines tended to be noblemen.

Towards the end of the 13th century, the Guelphs had secured their control of Florence through their multiple victories over the Ghibellines, including the battle at Benevento in 1266, and at Campaldino and Caprona in 1289. In 1267, as part of a political reconciliation, Guido married Beatrice, the daughter of Ghibelline party leader Farinata degli Uberti. Their marriage union proved unsuccessful, as the feuds between Guelph and Ghibelline families persisted.

By 1293, a rebellion of middle-class Florentine merchants toppled both sides of noble families. Nobles were then forbidden to claim public office, until 1295, when they were offered eligibility to join Florence's guilds. As a member of the Cavalcanti family, Guido had claimed ancestry dating back to the German barons of Charlemagne's court. He refused to occupy a position as a merchant, as he felt it offensive to his station and his heritage.

By 1300, infighting amongst the Guelphs had caused them to divide into two factions, the Black Guelphs and the White Guelphs. The Blacks continued to support the Papacy, while the Whites were opposed to Papal influence. Guido Cavalcanti allied himself with the White Guelphs, led by the Cerchi family, and developed a rivalry with Corso Donati of the Black Guelph faction.

By June 1300 the Florentines had become tired of the endless brawling between the White and Black Guelphs. The priors of Florence, Dante Alighieri serving amongst them, voted to exile the leaders of both factions and their accomplices, including Guido Cavalcanti. He was sent to Sarzana, a marshy place infested with malaria-bearing mosquitoes, where, after only a few months he decided to try to return to Florence. Guido Cavalcanti died of fever (probably malaria) in August of the same year on his journey home.

Guido's marriage to Beatrice degli Uberti should not be seen in the context of modern relationships where people marry each other for love, but rather in the context of his own age, when marriage was often motivated by business and/or political interests. As such, Guido's poetry, which dwells on love, should be seen as a philosophical exploration of love and not as that of a husband bound into and seeking satisfaction outside a marriage made for political purposes.

== Dolce stil novo ==
Cavalcanti was a part of the Tuscan poetic movement known as the dolce stil novo (Sweet New Style), whose members are referred to by their Tuscan name, the stilnovisti. The formative influences on the stilnovisti came from two main sources.

First, there was the poetry of the troubadour and trobairitz, who began the tradition of courtly love, known by its then contemporary term, as fin'amor in the ducal and princely courts of Aquitaine, Provence, Champagne and ducal Burgundy, at the end of the eleventh century. Based on the Occitan language of south France, this courtly poetry, which was a part of Occitan literature, spread throughout all European cultivated circles in the 12th and 13th centuries.

Second, there was the poetry of the Sicilian School, which was a small community of Sicilian, and to a lesser extent, mainland Italian poets gathered around Frederick II, most of them belonging to his court, the Magna Curia. Headed by Giacomo da Lentini, they produced more than 300 poems of courtly love between 1230 and 1266, the experiment being continued after Frederick's death by his son, Manfredi. This school included Enzio, king of Sardinia, Pier delle Vigne, Inghilfredi, Stefano Protonotaro, Guido and Odo delle Colonne, Rinaldo d'Aquino, Giacomino Pugliese, Arrigo Testa, Mazzeo Ricco, Perceval Doria, and Frederick II himself.

The poets of Stilnovismo included the early forerunner Guido Guinizelli, Guido Cavalcanti and Dante, plus Cino da Pistoia, Lapo Gianni, Gianni Alfani, and Dino Frescobaldi. Far from being a derivative school of poetry that mimicked its French and Sicilian poetic ancestors, Stilnovismo brought an originality to and completely transformed the poetry of courtly love in that: 1) it was an urban poetry of the Tuscan commune, not of an aristocratic court; 2) it explored the philosophical, spiritual, psychological and social effects of love; 3) it championed the Tuscan vernacular; 4) it did all this while expressing the heart and mind of the poet in original verse that utilized the sonnet, ballata and canzone forms of poetry. Cavalcanti was a central part of this accomplishment.

== Early poetry ==
In one of his earlier poems, Guido transforms the imagery of fin'amor, with its beautiful ladies and armed knights, into an idea that love has a philosophical component related to human intelligence and moral purity by equating it with a wise heart. He then proceeds to create a series of images of nature's serene beauty, which he then explains are all transcended by his lady's beauty, grace and noble heart; i.e., her emotions that are pure, based on wisdom, something he is incapable of.

Italian

Biltà di donna, e di saccente core
e cavalieri armati che sien genti,
cantar d'augelli e ragionar d'amore,
adorni legni 'n mar forte correnti,

aria serena quand'appar l'albore,
e bianca neve scender senza venti,
rivera d'acqua e prato d'ogni fiore,
oro e argento, azzurro 'n ornamenti,

ciò passa la beltate e la valenza
de la mia donna e 'l su' gentil coraggio,
sì che rassembra vile a chi ciò guarda.

E tanto più d'ogn'altra ha canoscenza,
quanto lo cielo de la terra è maggio:
A simil di natura ben non tarda.

Translation:
English

Beauty of women and wise hearts,
and noble armed cavaliers,
birds' song and reasonings about love,
adorned ships rapid sailing in strong seas,

serene air at dawn,
and white snow falling windlessly,
watery brooks and fields of all flowers,
gold, silver, lapis lazuli on jewels-

these are transcended by the beauty and grace
of my Lady and her gentle heart,
so that it [i.e. all those things] appears to be worthless to whom who looks at it,

so she is wiser than anyone,
as the heavens are greater than the earth:
to such a similar nature, goodness delays not.

This sonnet is an example of the Dolce Stil Novo movement and Cavalcanti's characteristic poetic idiom and structure.

The crowning achievement of Cavalcanti's poetic youth is his canzone Io non pensava che lo cor giammai in which he embodies his philosophical thoughts in a vernacular masterpiece. An analysis of two passages from this fifty-six-line poem reveals his core ideas on love.

Italian

Io non pensava che lo cor giammai
avesse di sospir tormento tanto,
che dell'anima mia nascesse pianto
mostrando per lo viso agli occhi morte.
...
Non sentìo pace né riposo alquanto
poscia ch'Amore e madonna trovai,
lo qual mi disse: – Tu non camperai,
ché troppo è lo valor di costei forte.

Translation:
English

I never used to think that my heart
could be so much suffering from sighs,
that crying would be generated from my soul,
revealing death through my face to [someone's] eyes.
...
I felt neither peace nor even rest
After I found Love and my Lady –
which said to me – you won't survive,
because too great her strength is.

Influenced by Averroës, the twelfth-century Islamic philosopher who commented on Aristotle, Cavalcanti saw humans with three basic capacities: the vegetative, which humans held in common with plants; the sensitive, which man shared with animals; and, the intellectual, which distinguished humans from the two lower forms. Averroës maintained that the proper goal of humanity was the cultivation of the intellect according to reason. Further, Averroës maintained that the intellect was part of a universal consciousness that came into the body at birth and returned to the universal consciousness after death. As such, it meant there was no afterlife, and, as well, the thing that gives an individual his or her identity was not the intellect, but the sensitive faculty, the appetites and desires of the body. Hence, the goal for Averroës and Cavalcanti was the perfection of the sensitive capacity through reason in order to achieve a balance between the body's physical desires and the intellect. This balance was considered the buon perfetto, the "good perfection." Guido thought this balance could not be achieved, which is why he speaks of “tormented laments” that makes his soul cry, that make his eyes dead, so he can feel “neither peace nor even rest in the place where I found love and my Lady.”

Italian

Di questa donna non si può contare:
ché di tante bellezze adorna vène,
che mente di qua giù no la sostene
sì che la veggia lo 'ntelletto nostro.
Tant'è gentil che, quand'eo penso bene,
l'anima sento per lo cor tremare
sì come quella che non può durare....

Translation:
English

Of her one couldn't sing
other than her coming in a beauty
that our lowly minds couldn't sustain
what our intellects saw
so gently noble is she that when she fills my mind
my soul feels my heart shiver
so it can't continue....

This passage explains the conflict between the sensitive and intellectual, as Guido's heart shivers as his "our lowly minds couldn't sustain what our intellects saw." All this is driven by the lofty beauty of his lady.

== Poetic maturity ==
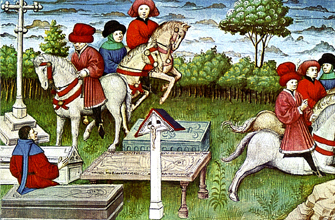
Cavalcanti e la Brigata Godereccia in a medieval miniature

Cavalcanti is best remembered for belonging to that small but influential group of Tuscan poets that started what is now known as Dolce Stil Novo, to which he contributed the following (note: translations provided in parentheses do not match the titles by which are widely known in English manuals but are meant to be a more literal rendering of the Italian originals): "Rosa fresca novella" (New, Fresh Rose), "Avete in vo' li fior e la verdura" (You Are Flowers in the Meadow), "Biltà di donna" (A Woman's Beauty), Chi è questa che vèn (Who's This Lady That Comes My Way), "Li mie' foll'occhi" (My Crazy Eyes), "L'anima Mia" (My Soul), "Guido Orlandi", "Da più a uno" (From Many to One), "In un boschetto" (In A Grove), "Per ch'io no spero" (Because I Do Not Hope), "Voi che per gli occhi mi passaste il core" (see below), and "Donna me prega" (A Lady Asks Me), a masterpiece of lyric verse and a small treatise on his philosophy of love. Starting from the model provided by the French troubadours, they took Italian poetry a step further and inaugurated the volgare illustre, that higher standard of Italian language that survives almost unchanged to the present day. The founder of this school, Guido Guinizzelli, a law professor at Bologna's University wrote the first poem of this kind, a poem whose importance does not so much lie in its literary merits but in outlining what would be the fundamentals of the Stil Novo program, which was further perfected by a second generation of poets, including Dante, Cino da Pistoia, Lapo Gianni, and Guido himself. As Dante wrote in his De Vulgari Eloquentia, I, XIII, 4:

Latin text

Sed quanquam fere omne Tusci in suo turpiloquio sint obtusi, nunnullos vulgaris excellentiam cognovisse sentimus, scilicit Guidonem, Lapum, et unum alium, Florentinos et Cynum Pistoriensem (...)"

Translation:
translation

Although most Tuscans are overwhelmed by their bad language, we judge that some have known the excellence of the vernacular, namely Guido, Lapo and another [i.e: Dante himself], all from Florence, and Cino da Pistoia.

Scholars have commented on the Dolce stil novo with Dante as probably the most spiritual and platonic in his portrayal of Beatrice (Vita Nuova), but Cino da Pistoia is able to write poetry in which "there is a remarkable psychological interest in love, a more tangible presence of the woman, who loses the abstract aura of Guinizzelli and Guido's verse" (Giudice-Bruni), and Guido Cavalcanti interprets love as a source of torment and despair in the surrendering of self to the beloved. An example in kind, and one of Guido's most widely read lyrics is a sonnet entitled Voi che per gli occhi mi passaste il core (Transl. You, Whose Look Pierced through My Heart), dedicated, to his beloved Monna (lady) Vanna:

Italian

Voi che per gli occhi mi passaste 'l core
e destaste la mente che dormìa,
guardate a l'angosciosa vita mia
che sospirando la distrugge amore

E' ven tagliando di sì gran valore
che deboletti spiriti van via
riman figura sol en segnoria
e voce alquanta, che parla dolore.

Questa vertù d'amor che m'ha disfatto
Da' vostri occhi gentil presta si mosse:
un dardo mi gittò dentro dal fianco.

Sì giunse ritto ‘l colpo al primo tratto,
che l’anima tremando si riscosse
veggendo morto ‘l cor nel lato manco.

Translation:
Translation

You whose look pierced through my heart,
Waking up my sleeping mind,
behold an anguished life
which love is killing with sighs.

So deeply love cuts my soul
that weak spirits are vanquished,
and what remains the only master
is this voice that speaks of woe.

This virtue of love, that has undone me
Came from your heavenly eyes:
It threw an arrow into my side.

So straight was the first blow
That the soul, quivering, reverberated,
seeing the heart on the left was dead.

Although there are many poems that exemplify Cavalcanti's poetic maturity, Certe mie rime a te mandar vogliendo is unparalleled in its originality, for here Guido adapts his medium of love to speak of his inner psychological state and the uncertainty of Dante's reaction in this example of occasional poetry. This is creativity at its highest, for Cavalcanti transforms the medium into a unique response to a real-world problem.

Italian

Certe mie rime a te mandar vogliendo
del greve stato che lo meo cor porta,
Amor aparve a me in figura morta
e disse: – Non mandar, ch'i' ti riprendo,

però che, se l'amico è quel ch'io 'ntendo,
e' non avrà già sì la mente accorta,
ch'udendo la 'ngiuliosa cosa e torta
ch'i' ti fo sostener tuttora ardendo,

temo non prenda sì gran smarrimento
ch'avante ch'udit' aggia tua pesanza
non si diparta da la vita il core.

E tu conosci ben ch'i' sono Amore;
però ti lascio questa mia sembianza
e pòrtone ciascun tu' pensamento

Translation:
Translation

When I wanted to send you certain poems
about my heart's grave state
Love appeared as a dead figure
saying – I warn you not to send them, I am wary of you

because if the friend is who I am imagining
his mind won't be ready
to hear of the slight and the injustice
I make you burn with

I fear he won't take such a large loss
as if his heart would leave him
if he heard of the gravity of things

and you well know I'm Love
for this reason I leave you this semblance of me
and carry away your thoughts.

Guido tells Dante how desire, how "wanting" has ruined his heart. He dramatically reinforces his condition through the appearance of Love—the medieval and Renaissance view of Love as Cupid matured into a grown man—in the guise of death, as if Guido is indeed on the verge of leaving this world. Love then warns him not to send this poem to Dante, who is not ready to deal with Guido's condition, given the depth of friendship Dante feels for him. Love also acknowledges that what he makes humanity suffer is "unjust," In sum, because of the love he has felt in life, Guido is ruined, and because of the depth of friendship Dante holds for him, Guido fears he may be ruined as well, seeing him in such a state.

=== Poetic masterpiece "Donna me prega" ===
Through his study of Averroës, and perhaps due to his native temperament, Cavalcanti held the pessimistic view that humans were limited in the sort of ultimate attainment they could achieve. The intellect could never be brought into harmony based on reason with bodily desires.

The crowning achievement of Guido's poetic career is his masterpiece, the philosophical canzone Donna me prega (A lady asks me). It is a full-fledged treatise of his personal thoughts and beliefs on love. Through it, he transforms all that came before him and influenced him: courtly love, the troubadours, the Sicilian School and his peers of the Dolce stil novo.

Guido says he was prompted to write it by his mistress, according to a formula very widespread in the tradition of love poetry. As such, Guido's doctrine draws on the greatest medieval poets or scholars, such as Chrétien de Troyes and Brunetto Latini. There are several hints to the Roman de la Rose, then considered the "Bible" of courtly love. For example, in the famous line "a man who does not experience it [love] cannot picture it", a common axiom variously quoted from the troubadours to Dante's Vita Nuova. "Donna me prega", a remarkable anatomy of love, is divided into five stanzas of fourteen variously rhymed lines of eleven syllables each. The subject is divided into eight chapters dealing with

1. Where love is located in the human body
2. What causes it
3. What his faculties (virtues) are
4. His power (what it can do or cause)
5. His essence (what it is made of)
6. His motions (or alterations it causes in the human body or mind)
7. What makes us call it love
8. The possibility of probing its effects using our sight.

In short, the sensitive, like the rational soul is located in the brain, but does not produce love feelings unless the eyes meet those of a particular woman who has an exclusive affinity to him. This complies with Aristotle's theory of cause and effect, whereby no effect can proceed from an object if the object has not the potential to accomplish it. When a woman's look meets the eyes of a man, the potential for love grows into passion, a spirit or fluid that possesses all his faculties. Such a passion needs more and more love to satisfy its ever-growing appetite, until (when desire outstrips human limits) he is led to insanity and death.

This highly philosophical canzone was extremely influential, and it was commented upon by authors including Dino del Garbo, pseudo-Giles, Giles of Rome, Marsilio Ficino, Pico della Mirandola, Iacopo Mini, and Francesco de Vieri (see Enrico Fenzi, La canzone d'amore di Guido Cavalcanti e i suoi antichi commenti, Melangolo, 1999).

While this has very little to do with modern psychology, Guido's philosophy of spiritelli was part of the guiding principles of Arabic medicine, considered very advanced in Dante's time. The merit of such philosophy in Cavalcanti's verse is its ability to describe what goes through the poet's mind in a very detailed, personal manner, creating sensuous, autobiographic poetry. This is revolutionary compared to the rhetoric and academic-seeming manner of the Sicilian and Neo-Sicilian Schools that had preceded the Dolce Stil Novo and, perhaps, a sign of the changing times.

== Mentions in Dante's Divine Comedy ==
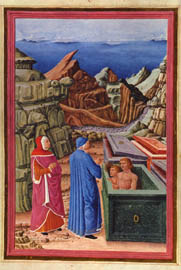
Dante and Virgil talking to Cavalcante de' Cavalcanti, father of Guido, in a scene from Dante's Inferno

Guido Cavalcanti indirectly appears twice in Dante's Divine Comedy. The first occurs in Inferno X, where Dante encounters the souls of heretics. They are condemned in the sixth circle of Hell, trapped inside burning tombs. Guido's father, Cavalcante de' Cavalcanti, is among these heretics, and proceeds to ask Dante about his son. Dante refers to Guido in the past tense, thus leading Cavalcante to believe that Guido is dead. Dante, later feeling guilty, asks Farinata degli Uberti, another heretic, to inform Cavalcante that Guido remains alive.

Guido's name arrives once more in Purgatory XI, mentioned by Oderisi da Gubbio to Dante on the terrace of pride. The former employs the fame of Guido Guinizelli, soon overpowered by that of Guido Cavalcanti, to justify the fleeting nature of fame in their larger discussion of vanity. Through Oderisi's words, Dante further asserts himself, as a poet, to be the next in line, replacing Guido in terms of public interest.

It has been suggested that Guido Cavalcanti's presence in Dante's Divine Comedy permeates further than Dante's two mentions of him by name. His cynical beliefs towards the subject of desire, demonstrated in Donna me prega with images of wrath and death, have been proposed as inspiration for Dante's contrapasso observed in Inferno V, where the carnal sinners are tossed uncontrollably by the winds of a never-ending storm. The difference between the two literary works, in their contexts, is in their treatment of love, since Guido, according to one influential viewpoint, believed that all love led to a loss of rationale. Dante, opposed to this belief, it is argued, used Guido's definition for a perverted love instead, within the circle of lust.

== Legacy ==
Cavalcanti is widely regarded as the first major poet of Italian literature: Dante sees in Guido his mentor; his meter, his language deeply inspire his work (cfr. De Vulgari Eloquentia), though Guido's esthetic materialism would be taken a step further to an entirely new spiritual, Christian vision of the gentler sex, as personified by Beatrice whose soul becomes Dante's guide to Paradise.

Guido's controversial personality and beliefs attracted the interest of Boccaccio, who made him one of the most famous heretical characters in his Decameron, helping popularise the belief about his atheism. Cavalcanti would be studied with perhaps more interest during the Renaissance, by such scholars as Luigi Pulci and Pico della Mirandola. By passing to Dante's study of the Italian language, Guido's style has influenced all those who, like Cardinal Pietro Bembo, helped turn the volgare illustre into today's Italian language.

Cavalcanti was to become a strong influence on a number of writers associated with the development of Modernist poetry in English. This influence can be traced back to the appearance, in 1861, of Dante Gabriel Rossetti's The Early Italian Poets, which featured translations of works by both Cavalcanti and Dante.

The young Ezra Pound admired Rossetti and knew his Italian translations well, quoting extensively from them in his 1910 book The Spirit of Romance. In 1912, Pound published his own translations under the title The Sonnets and Ballate of Guido Cavalcanti and in 1932, he published the Italian poet's works as Rime. A reworked translation of Donna me prega formed the bulk of Canto XXXVI in Pound's long poem The Cantos. Pound's main focus was on Cavalcanti's philosophy of love and light, which he viewed as a continuing expression of a pagan, neo-platonic tradition stretching back through the troubadours and early medieval Latin lyrics to the world of pre-Christian polytheism. Pound also composed a three-act opera titled Cavalcanti at the request of Archie Harding, a producer at the BBC. Though never performed in his lifetime, excerpts are available on audio CD.

Pound's friend and fellow modernist T. S. Eliot used an adaptation of the opening line of Perch'i' no spero di tornar giammai ("Because I do not hope to turn again") to open his 1930 poem Ash Wednesday.

British composer Beryl Price (born 1912) composed Songs from Cavalcanti based on the poet’s texts.

== See also ==
- Italian literature

== Bibliography ==
- Cavalcanti's Rime in original Italian available through Wikisource.
- Maria Corti, La felicità mentale. Nuove prospettive per Cavalcanti e Dante, Turin, Einaudi, 1983.
- Tobias Eisermann, Cavalcanti oder die Poetik der Negativität, Band 17 in Romanica et Comparatistica: Sprach- und literaturwissenschaftliche Studien, herausgegeben von Richard Baum und Willi Hirdt, Tübingen: Stauffenburg Verlag Brigitte Narr GmbH, 1992; ISBN 3-923721-67-6
- Giudice, A. and Bruni, G. Problemi e scrittori della letteratura italiana. Turin, Paravia, 1973.
- Dante, Divina Commedia, ed. Natalino Sapegno. Florence, La Nuova Italia, 1982.
- AA.VV., Antologia della poesia italiana, ed C.Segre and C. Ossola. Turin, Einaudi, 1999
- Migliorini, B. Storia della lingua Italiana. Florence, Sansoni, 1987
- Dante, Vita Nuova. Milan, Garzanti, 1982.
- Guido Cavalcanti, The Complete Poems, edited and translated by Marc Cirigliano. New York, Italica Press, 1992; ISBN 978-0-934977-27-2
- Guido Cavalcanti, Complete Poems, translated by Anthony Mortimer. Oneworld Classics.
