= Mikó Szécs =

Mikó (II) Szécs

Master of the horse
- Reign: 1291
- Predecessor: John Csák
- Successor: Thomas Hont-Pázmány
- Died: 1305 or 1306; Esztergom
- Noble family: gens Szécs
- Spouse: N Vázsony
- Father: Mikó I

Mikó (II) from the kindred Szécs (Hungarian: Szécs nembeli (II.) Mikó; died 1305 or 1306) was a Hungarian nobleman and courtier, who served as Master of the horse for a short time in 1291. He was a confidant of Lodomer, Archbishop of Esztergom.

== Land property and courtly career ==
Mikó II was born into the gens Szécs as the son of Mikó I. Through maternal side, he was related to Sixtus, a canon of Esztergom and illustrious diplomat in the royal court of King Béla IV. Paul of Komárom referred to the late Mikó as his "frater" on 6 October 1306, which suggests they were brothers. However in medieval Latin terminology, the phrase "frater" also meant simply a (distant) "relative". Historian Krisztina Tóth argued Paul connected to the Szécs clan only from maternal side, as Mikó did not mention him in his last will and testament in 1305.

He appeared first in contemporary sources in 1258, when Sixtus sold some part of his inherited land in Hetény (today Chotín in Slovakia) to his relative and neighbour Mikó, in order to finance his diplomatic mission to Rome. In 1270, Sixtus was among the members of the Hungarian delegation sent to Naples which escorted the then twelve-year-old princess Mary to marry Charles the Lame. Before that he sold another part of Hetény for 70 silver coins to Mikó. When Palatine Matthew Csák was entrusted to restore law and order in the realm by King Ladislaus IV in 1278, Mikó had to prove the legitimate acquisition of his holdings before Matthew, who resided in Komárom (today Komárno in Slovakia) at the end of the year. Thus he successfully avoided the confiscation of his lands. In 1280, he acquired other parts in the land of Hetény from Archbishop Lodomer, in exchange for his portions in Födémes and Szőlős in Komárom County.

In the first half of the 1280s, Mikó married an unidentified daughter of Maurice Vázsony, a relative and bailiff to Archbishop Lodomer. Following that, Mikó sold half of the Hetény estate for 50 silver coins to his father-in-law on 17 April 1285. They jointly bought further land in Hetény from Ampud of Macsala, another relative of Sixtus in 1287. Both Maurice and Mikó belonged to the inner circle of Queen Elizabeth of Sicily (or Isabella), who was protegeed by Lodomer after her release from imprisonment in the Margaret Island. Elizabeth stayed in Esztergom and established her own court there. She made Mikó as her Master of the horse around May 1290. A charter from that year narrated that Mikó accidentally broke the queen's seal, when Benedict Rád, Bishop of Veszprém requested confirmation the ownership of lands in Zala County. Despite this, Elizabeth donated the lands of Szentvidkála and Csicsónivegy to Mikó. After Benedict's protestation, the Queen donated Lovas and Vámos in Veszprém County to him, instead. Soon, Ladislaus IV was assassinated on 10 July 1290. His widow Elizabeth stayed in Esztergom under the protection of Lodomer, who supported the arrival King Andrew III. Mikó was appointed Master of the horse in the royal court for a short time in 1291.

== Later life ==
In 1292, he was present before the chapter of Pécs as a witness during a long-term lawsuit against the citizens of Esztergom, who looted the goods of the Archdiocese of Esztergom and attacked the houses of the local provost and the two canons still after the death of Béla IV in 1270. Mikó remained in the town even after Lodomer's death in January 1298 and Elizabeth's departure to Naples in late 1299. Mikó made his last testament and will on 16 December 1305. As brothers Ivan and Henry II Kőszegi besieged and captured Esztergom Castle in that year, Krisztina Tóth considered Mikó was fatally wounded in the skirmish. She argued his last will was not done in the usual way as prominent members of the local chapter fled from the advancing Kőszegi troops.

Mikó donated most of his property to the Augustinians of Esztergom who resided in the St. Anne friary, where Mikó formerly also built a chapel. He bequeathed his lands in Hetény and Örs (today part of Komárno) to the Archdiocese of Esztergom. For his late wife's spiritual salvation, he donated his vineyard in Esztergom and half of the Hort island to the St. Anne friary. His possible niece Gyöngyös received other parts of Hort and Kistata, while his unidentified sister was granted a quarter from Hort. Mikó died childless by 6 October 1306, when his relative Paul Szécs neglected his last will and requested to donate the above mentioned lands for himself from King Otto for his loyalty.

== Sources ==
- Tóth, Krisztina (2011). "A Szécs nemzetség és rokoni kapcsolatai [The Szécs kindred and its Family Relationships]". Turul (in Hungarian). 84 (2). Magyar Heraldikai és Genealógiai Társaság: 37–42. ISSN 1216-7258.
- Zsoldos, Attila (2011). Magyarország világi archontológiája, 1000–1301 [Secular Archontology of Hungary, 1000–1301] (in Hungarian). História, MTA Történettudományi Intézete. ISBN 978-963-9627-38-3.

Mikó II Genus Szécs Born: ? Died: 1305 or 1306
Political offices
Preceded by John Csák (?)	Master of the horse 1291	Succeeded by Thomas Hont-Pázmány
