= Giordano d'Agliano =

Giordano d'Agliano, (Note: Sometimes given as Giordano d'Anglano. The anglicized form Jordan of Agliano/Anglano is sometimes preferred.) sometimes Giordano Lancia (Note: Sometimes spelled Giordano Lanza. The anglicized form Jordan Lancia/Lanza is sometimes preferred.) (died 1267), was an Italian nobleman and military commander who served as marshal of the Kingdom of Sicily under King Manfred (1258–1266). He played a prominent role in the wars of the Guelphs and Ghibellines in Tuscany.

Giordano was a relative of the lords of Agliano in the Piedmont, although his family relationships are not easy to reconstruct from the sources. The lords of Agliano were probably a branch of the family of the marquises of Busca, as were the Lancia or Lanza. The Agliano and Lancia have long been confused with each other, but they were distinct families related through the female line. Giordano was the cousin of Bianca Lancia, wife of the Emperor Frederick II and mother of Manfred.

On 8 June 1213, Giordano all his stake and property in the castle and village of Agliano to the city and commune of Asti. The commune made him a citizen and then granted him his former properties as a fief. In 1217, he was one of the citizens who witnessed the commune's acquisition of fiefs in Canelli and its receipt of donated land in Saluzzo. On 27 February 1219, he witnessed the making of an alliance between Asti and the Marquis Enrico II del Carretto directed against the commune of Alba. On 19 April 1227, he witnessed another municipal alliance, this time with the Marquis Boniface II of Montferrat against the commune of Alessandria.

The exact date when Giordano arrived in the Kingdom of Sicily is unknown, but he and several other relatives of Bianca Lancia (died 1246) went there in the service of Frederick II. When Manfred became king, he enfeoffed Giordano with the counties of Montalbano, Giovinazzo and San Severino.

In 1260, Jordan was sent by Manfred with some hundreds of German knights as vicar-general and captain of Tuscany at the request of the Commune of Siena. Meeting with the leaders of the allied towns of Arezzo and Pisa at Empoli, Jordan was convinced by Farinata degli Uberti not to attack Florence itself, Siena's chief enemy and a centre of Guelph power. On 4 September, the Sienese army, depending largely on the German mercenaries, met the Florentine on a hill outside Siena in the Battle of Montaperti. Jordan and his cavalry led the second charge. Jordan followed up this victory by quickly snatching Florence itself, though once again Farinata intervened to prevent the razing of the city walls. He established Guido Novello as podestà and returned with his mercenaries after their paid service of three and a half months.

After the Battle of Benevento, Jordan was one of the captured who fell into the hands of Charles of Anjou. He was stripped of his eyes, a hand and a foot, and imprisoned in a jail in Brolo where he spent his days until he was decapitated. Brunetto Latini's Il Tesoro portrays Jordan wishing rather to die than endure further mutilation and then talking to his own severed hand, which, the encyclopaedist points out, dubbed many knights in its day.

== Primary sources ==
- Giovanni Villani, Florentine Chronicle, translated by David Burr.
