= Chotin =

Chotin may refer to several places in middle Europe:

- Chotín, a village in south Slovakia in Komarno District.
- Khotyn, a village in Chernivtsi Oblast in Ukraine.
