= Andrew of Hungary (historian) =

The start of Andrew's Descriptio in the only manuscript copy. The rubric (red text) is the long title. The text begins with a decorated initial V for Victor.

Andrew of Hungary (Latin: Andreas Ungarus; fl. 1270–1271) was a Hungarian priest, diplomat and writer. He wrote an account in Latin of Charles of Anjou's conquest of the Kingdom of Sicily, conventionally known as the Descriptio victoriae a Karolo Provinciae comite reportate ('Description of the reported victory by Count Charles of Provence').

== Life ==
Andrew was a chaplain to Kings Béla IV (1235–1270) and Stephen V of Hungary (1270–1272). In 1270–1271, bearing the title "master" (magister), he was part of a diplomatic mission led by Sixtus of Esztergom, as historian Jenő Szűcs considered. Sent by Stephen V to congratulate Charles of Anjou on the latter's return from the Eighth Crusade, the four-man delegation travelled via Naples to Catona and Messina in December and January, then with Charles to Rome in February. Andrew, however, did not return to Hungary, but remained behind in the service of Charles. He eventually attached himself to Charles's nephew, Count Peter I of Alençon, whom he followed to France.

In contrast, Dániel Bácsatyai argued that Andrew arrived in the Kingdom of Naples much earlier. Stephen V was already crowned king sometime around 1246, Andrew could serve as a chaplain in his ducal court too. Bácsatyai identified Andrew with that Andreas Ungarus, who entered the service of Cardinal Stephen Báncsa prior to 1262. In that year, he was granted a praebenda (benefaction) of the chapter of Corinth by Pope Urban IV. In this capacity, he frequently stayed in Rome and the perspective of his work also confirms that he was in the Holy See when the events took place. Andrew was therefore a personal witness to the war. Following the death of Stephen Báncsa in 1270, he entered the service of Peter I of Alençon.

== Descriptio ==
Andrew dedicated his Descriptio to Peter of Alençon. He wrote it in France, probably around 1272, certainly before Peter's death in 1284. Dániel Bácsatyai considered Andrew compiled his work sometime between August 1270 (Béla IV and Louis IX of France are already referred to as dead) and early 1272 (Stephen V and Bartolomeo Pignatelli, Archbishop of Messina are mentioned as living persons), most likely in 1271, incorporating his records into a coherent work. Only a single copy of survives in Paris, Bibliothèque nationale de France, MS lat. 5192, a 15th-century manuscript from Naples.

=== Analysis ===
In the conflict between Guelph and Ghibelline factions in Italy, Andrew took the side of the former. He wrote with strong praise for Charles and disdain for his opponent, King Manfred. He calls Charles a second Charlemagne sent to "recover the goods of the Empire". This concept originated in Guelph circles in Italy and Andrew may be responsible for its introduction into northern France. The purpose of the Descriptio was probably to justify Charles's foreign intervention to a northern French audience. While later French authors made much of Manfred's illegitimacy—he was considered a usurper of his nephew, Conradin—Andrew presents both Conradin and Manfred equally as oppressors of the church.

The letter of Hugh of Bauches, with a decorated initial D

Despite his obvious biases, Andrew's Descriptio is "a basically authentic account of contemporary history." The Hungarian historian Jenő Szűcs contrasts it with the Gesta Hunnorum et Hungarorum written by Simon of Kéza, also a diplomat on the mission of 1270–1271:

On the one hand, there is Master Simon's fantastic historical construct, in which even his memories of southern Italy serve to enhance the Hun–Magyar glory, and ... On the other hand, there is Master Andres's Descriptio, undoubtedly at a higher level both in organisation and literary merit ... with a biblical tone of universalism and a corresponding partisanship with the Guelph and hatred of the Ghibelline cause. These works represent the two diverging roads of the medieval spirit: the one seeks primarily ... the particular place of his own nation; the other [Andrew] adopts unreservedly the "supranational" world of ideas.

=== Synopsis ===
Chronologically, Andrew's Descriptio covers the period from the deposition of the Emperor Frederick II at the First Council of Lyon (1245) until the aftermath of Charles's victory over Manfred at the Battle of Benevento (1266).

Andrew's account of the Battle of Benevento is the centrepiece of the Descriptio and is partially based on eyewitness reports. He writes that Charles camped two miles out from Benevento on 25 February. He ordered the whole army to take communion, which was administered by the chancellor, Jean d'Acy, assisted by the Franciscans and Dominicans. He incorporates into the Descriptio a translation of a letter in French written by a participant in the battle, a knight named Hugh of Bauches, and addressed to the knighthood and nobility of Anjou and Touraine. According to Hugh, the French were making little headway against the German knights in tight formation armed with longswords until Charles urged them to aim for the Germans' armpits with their daggers, as was recommended in the book of military art. The book referred to is book 1.12 of Vegetius' De re militari. Andrew also includes a letter written by Charles to Pope Clement IV in the aftermath of his victory.

Andrew reports that, when the Muslim settlement of Lucera surrendered to Charles after Benevento, it was forced to destroy its fortifications, but was permitted to keep its religion, for which privilege it paid Charles gold and silver. Contrary to Andrew's account, however, there is evidence that the fortifications of Lucera were not destroyed at this time.

== Editions ==
- Waitz, Georg (1882). "Andreae Ungari descriptio victoriae a Karolo Provinciae comite reportate". MGH, Scriptores. Vol. 26. Hanover: Hahn. pp. 559–580.
- Mendola, Louis, trans. (2021). The Battle of Benevento According to Andrew of Hungary and Saba Malaspina. New York: Trinacria Editions.

== Bibliography ==
- Bachrach, David S. (2004). "The Friars Go to War: Mendicant Military Chaplains, 1216–c.1300". The Catholic Historical Review. 90 (4): 617–633.
- Bácsatyai, Dániel (2017). "A 13. századi francia–magyar kapcsolatok néhány kérdése" (PDF). Századok. 151 (2): 237–278.
- Bredekamp, Horst (2021) [2010]. Image Acts: A Systematic Approach to Visual Agency. Translated by Elizabeth Clegg. De Gruyter. doi:10.1515/9783110725827.
- France, John (2003). "Property, Warfare, and the Renaissance of the Twelfth Century". The Haskins Society Journal. 11: 73–84.
- Jones, Chris (2007). Eclipse of Empire? Perceptions of the Western Empire and its Rulers in Late-Medieval France. Brepols.
- Molinier, Auguste (1903). "2766. Andreas Hungarus, Descriptio victoriae a Karolo, Provinciae comite, reportatae". Collections numériques de la Sorbonne. 3: 166.
- Szűcs, Jenő (1999). "Theoretical Elements in Master Simon of Kéza's Gesta Hungarorum (1282–1285)". In László Veszprémy; Frank Schaer (eds.). Simon of Kéza: Deeds of the Hungarians. Central European University Press. pp. xxix–cii.
- Taylor, Julie (2003). Muslims in Medieval Italy: The Colony at Lucera. Lexington Books.
