= Szécs (genus) =

Genus (gens) Szécs
- Country: Kingdom of Hungary
- Founded: 13th century
- Founder: Szécs (?)
- Final ruler: Paul
- Dissolution: c. 1307

Szécs (Seech or Scheech) was the name of a gens (Latin for "clan"; nemzetség in Hungarian) in the Kingdom of Hungary.

The kindred owned lands exclusively in Komárom and Esztergom Counties. As there is no such place name (Szécs) in this region, it is presumable the kindred took its name after their founder who perhaps lived at the turn of the 12th and 13th centuries. The kindred's ancient lands, Hetény (today Chotín in Slovakia), Födémes and Szőlős were still royal estates in the first half of the 13th century. Thus historian Krisztina Tóth considered the ancestor(s) of the Szécs clan belonged to the social status of royal servants who owned possession and was subordinate only to the king. For his service, they elevated to the nobility by the second half of the century.

== Notable members ==
- Mikó II (fl. 1258–1305): son of Mikó I, Master of the horse (1291)
- Paul (fl. 1286–1306): possibly son of Mikó I or Paul, he might be connected to the genus only from maternal side. He was lord of Komárom (today Komárno, Slovakia) since the 1280s and entered into a formal feudal alliance with King Andrew III in 1298.
- Nicholas (fl. 1286–1297): possibly brother of Paul, he was perhaps identical with that Nicholas, who served as ispán of Győr and Komárom Counties in 1297
- Stephen (fl. 1307–1318): possibly son of Paul (II), he handed over the castle of Komárom to Matthew Csák after his father's death; his lands were confiscated by King Charles I

== Sources ==
- Karácsonyi, János (1901). A magyar nemzetségek a XIV. század közepéig. III. kötet [The Hungarian genera until the middle of the 14th century, Vol. 3] (in Hungarian). Hungarian Academy of Sciences.
- Tóth, Krisztina (2011). "A Szécs nemzetség és rokoni kapcsolatai [The Szécs kindred and its Family Relationships]". Turul (in Hungarian). 84 (2). Magyar Heraldikai és Genealógiai Társaság: 37–42. ISSN 1216-7258.
- Zsoldos, Attila (2011). Magyarország világi archontológiája, 1000–1301 [Secular Archontology of Hungary, 1000–1301] (in Hungarian). História, MTA Történettudományi Intézete. ISBN 978-963-9627-38-3.
