= Paul Szécs =

13th-century Hungarian nobleman

- Lord of Komárom

Ispán of Komárom
- Reign: 1298–1299
- Predecessor: Nicholas Szécs
- Successor: Matthew Csák
- Died: 1306 or 1307
- Noble family: gens Szécs
- Issue: Stephen
- Father: Mikó or Paul (?)

Paul from the kindred Szécs (Hungarian: Szécs nembeli Pál), also known as Paul of Komárom (Hungarian: Komáromi Pál; died 1306 or 1307), was a Hungarian nobleman and landowner who was lord of Komárom (present-day Komárno, Slovakia) from the 1280s. He came to prominence during the last regnal years of Andrew III of Hungary.

== Family relationships ==
As a majority of contemporary sources style him simply as "Paul of Komárom", his kinship origin is uncertain and problematic. 19th-century historian and archivist Károly Ráth concatenated his career to the suppositional early political activity of Charles I of Hungary's influential baron Paul Nagymartoni, claiming that the two Pauls, ispáns of Győr County at the end of the 13th century and the beginning of the 14th century were, in fact, the same person. Decades later, historian Mór Wertner considered Paul belonged to the gens Koppán, as this clan owned the majority of the estates in Komárom County.

Historian Gyula Pauler was the first scholar who listed his person among the members of the gens Szécs, albeit his theory based on a false assumption (he incorrectly identified Zsitvafödémes as an ancient estate of the kindred, instead of Födémes in Komárom County). Nevertheless, György Györffy reached a similar conclusion, referring to a charter from October 1306, which called Paul as the "frater" of the late Mikó Szécs (son of Mikó, Sr.), who formerly served as Master of the horse. On this basis, numerous historians claim Paul was a brother of Mikó (and thus also a son of Mikó, Sr.), however in medieval Latin terminology, the phrase "frater" also meant simply a (distant) "relative". Krisztina Tóth argued Paul connected to the genus only from maternal side, as Mikó did not mention him in his last will in 1305. Paul first appeared in contemporary sources with a certain Nicholas of Komárom. Both Györffy and Tóth suggested that they were brothers and identified him with Nicholas, son of Paul who served as ispán of Győr County just before Paul Szécs.

== Career ==
According to an undated royal charter by Ladislaus IV, possibly around 1286, the King authorized Lodomer, Archbishop of Esztergom to excommunicate Paul and Nicholas, if they would confiscate two-thirds part of the trade customs in Komárom which were entitled to the Bakonybél Abbey. That data confirmed they jointly owned Komárom Castle since the mid-1280s. Formerly the castle was possessed by Thomas Hont-Pázmány who was killed in the Battle on the Marchfeld in 1278. Following that Ladislaus IV entrusted Palatine Matthew II Csák to restore law and order in the whole kingdom. After fleeing Sopron, he made judgments in Komárom at the end of the year. Based on this, historian Gyula Kristó claimed the castle belonged to the Csák kindred's domain since that, however it appeared as a royal property both in 1283 and 1284. Krisztina Tóth argued, unlike the Csáks, the powerful Kőszegi family, who remained without rival in Transdanubia after the deaths of Matthew II and Peter I Csák, indeed occupied Komárom Castle. Accordingly, the Szécs brothers, among other local noble kindreds, were forced to take an oath of loyalty to the Kőszegi realm, and as their familiares, acted as "castellans" of Komárom Castle after that. In 1297, Lodomer still referred to Paul Szécs as "usurper" of some goods which lawfully ought to belong to the Bakonybél Abbey.

By 1297, the relationship between Andrew III and the infamous oligarch Matthew III Csák worsened and the King deprived him of his office of Palatine. Matthew, who ruled de facto independently the north-western counties, turned against Andrew and thus expanded his influence along the Zsitva (Žitava) river, while defeated the Forgács branch of the Hont-Pázmány clan. The assembly of the prelates, noblemen, Saxons, Székelys, and Cumans in Pest in the summer of 1298 mentioned "the laxity of the lord king" and accepted decrees authorized Andrew to destroy forts built without permission and ordered the punishment of those who had seized landed property with force. After the close of the diet, Andrew III entered into a formal feudal alliance with four influential barons – Amadeus Aba, Stephen Ákos, Dominic Rátót, Demetrius Balassa – and, surprisingly, Paul Szécs who stated that they were willing to support him against the Pope and the bishops. Tóth considered, Paul and Nicholas, who disappeared from contemporary records after 1297, when presumably died, started negotiations with the King who intended to establish an alliance among the local noblemen against the oligarchs – most notably Matthew Csák and the Kőszegis. As a result, the Szécs brothers left the Kőszegi allegiance and joined Andrew's partisans, along with other families, for instance the gens Osl. Paul Szécs was made ispán of Komárom, Győr and Moson Counties around July 1298. Komárom Castle under the command of Paul Szécs became an important royal stronghold against the oligarchic provinces in Transdanubia. King Andrew III commissioned him to isolate Matthew Csák's realm from westward, while he also had to prevent the Kőszegis' expansion northwards. In 1299, Paul was also mentioned as ispán of Sopron County, but this position was merely nominal as the territory of the county was seized by the Kőszegis since the 1280s.

Paul Szécs' prominence at the royal court lasted for a relatively short time. In response to Andrew's newly formed league, a group of powerful lords —including the Kőszegis, Matthew Csák and Roland Borsa — urged Charles II of Naples to send his grandson, the 12-year-old Charles Robert, to Hungary in order to become king, according to the Illuminated Chronicle. The young prince disembarked in Split in August 1300, supported by most Croatian and Slavonian lords. However, the Kőszegis and Matthew Csák were shortly reconciled with Andrew, preventing Charles' success. Historian Attila Zsoldos argued Andrew III entered into a new feudal contract with the barons in the summer of 1300: Matthew Csák and Ivan Kőszegi became "perpetual" Palatines and Andrew accepted their suzerainty over their provinces, while the neighbouring Demetrius Balassa and Paul Szécs, lords of Zólyom and Komárom respectively, lost all of their influences and dignities. Nevertheless, Paul was present at Andrew's deathbed on 14 January 1301, when the last scion of the Árpád dynasty died. He was among the barons and prelates beside Dowager Queen Agnes, who ordered the guarding and renovation of the royal palace in Óbuda.

== Later life ==
After the death of Andrew III, Paul was among those barons who refused to accept Charles's rule and proposed the crown to Wenceslaus II of Bohemia's son and namesake, Wenceslaus, whose bride, Elizabeth, was Andrew III's only daughter. His loyalty to Wenceslaus resulted that Stephen Csák, a faithful confidant of Charles, captured and imprisoned him around 1304. He was released after Mark Pápa paid ransom. Returning home, Paul founded a Benedictine monastery in Komárom, dedicated to Virgin Mary. He provided a portion of the local fish market's duty to finance its operation. He was forced to become a familiaris of the powerful lord Matthew Csák around that time. After Wenceslaus abandoned his claim to Hungary in favor of Otto III of Bavaria on 9 October 1305, Paul supported the new pretender. For his loyalty, he asked land donations for himself; Hetény (today Chotín in Slovakia) and Örs (today part of Komárno) in Komárom County, and Kistata and Hort in Esztergom County, neglecting his relative Mikó's last will and testament, who owned these estates. After receiving Otto's diploma, Paul promptly handed over the lands to Nicholas Banai, husband of Paul's relative Gyöngyös.

Paul last appeared as a living person on 6 October 1306, when he published a charter with his seal in Komárom. On 6 August 1307, his unidentified widow resorted transliteration the above-mentioned charter to the chapter of Győr. After Paul's death, his son Stephen joined the Csák domain and handed over the castle of Komárom and its surrounding areas to Matthew Csák, who was already present in the town on 14 August. In 1308, Stephen was among Matthew's "loyal men" at the meeting of Kékes. On 3 August 1318, Charles I confiscated Stephen's lands for "his betrayal" and donated them to the sons of Lawrence Banai.

== Sources ==
- Engel, Pál (1996). Magyarország világi archontológiája, 1301–1457, I. [Secular Archontology of Hungary, 1301–1457, Volume I] (in Hungarian). História, MTA Történettudományi Intézete. ISBN 963-8312-44-0.
- Szűcs, Jenő (2002). Az utolsó Árpádok [The Last Árpáds] (in Hungarian). Osiris Kiadó. ISBN 963-389-271-6.
- Tóth, Krisztina (2011). "A Szécs nemzetség és rokoni kapcsolatai [The Szécs kindred and its Family Relationships]". Turul (in Hungarian). 84 (2). Magyar Heraldikai és Genealógiai Társaság: 37–42. ISSN 1216-7258.
- Zsoldos, Attila (2011a). Magyarország világi archontológiája, 1000–1301 [Secular Archontology of Hungary, 1000–1301] (in Hungarian). História, MTA Történettudományi Intézete. ISBN 978-963-9627-38-3.
- Zsoldos, Attila (2011b). "III. András hat nádora [The Six Palatines of Andrew III]". In Cabello, Juan; C. Tóth, Norbert (eds.). Erősségénél fogva várépítésre való: Tanulmányok a 70 éves Németh Péter tiszteletére [It is Very Well Placed for a Castle: Studies for the 70-year-old Péter Németh] (in Hungarian). Szabolcs-Szatmár-Bereg Megyei Önkormányzat Múzeumok Igazgatósága. pp. 289–299. ISBN 978-963-7220-75-3.

Paul Genus Szécs Born: ? Died: 1306 or 1307
Political offices
Preceded by Nicholas Szécs	Ispán of Győr; 1298–1299	Succeeded by Paul Nagymartoni (?)
Preceded by Nicholas Szécs	Ispán of Komárom; 1298–1299	Succeeded by Matthew Csák (?)
Preceded by James Győr	Ispán of Moson; 1298–1299	Succeeded by Ivan Kőszegi
Preceded by Ivan Kőszegi	Ispán of Sopron; 1299	Succeeded by Ivan Kőszegi
