= Simon of Kéza =

Hungarian chronicler

Simon of Kéza (Hungarian: Kézai Simon) was the most famous Hungarian chronicler of the 13th century. He was a priest in the royal court of king Ladislaus IV of Hungary.

In 1270–1271, bearing the title "master" (magister), Simon was part of a diplomatic mission led by Sixtus of Esztergom. Andrew of Hungary was also a part of this mission. Sent by King Stephen V of Hungary to congratulate King Charles I of Sicily on the latter's return from the Eighth Crusade, the delegation travelled via Naples to Catona and Messina in December and January, then back with Charles to Rome in February.

His most important work is Gesta Hunnorum et Hungarorum, written in Latin around 1282, in which he gives a vivid description of the history of the Huns and the Hungarians (whom he considered relatives), from the legendary beginnings until the contemporary period. As a personal secretary of the king, he worked in the royal archives and collected his material from older chronicles conserved there.

The chronicle was first published in print in 1782 in Buda. In the 19th century it was translated into Hungarian and became a popular work which helped the development of national consciousness.
