= Gilles de Trasignies =

Gilles de Trasignies (1199–1276) was Constable of France under King Louis IX. Before 1226, he was married to Ida de Sotrud, lady of Bailleul sur l'Escaut, and the granddaughter of Englebert IV d'Enghien. He started his career at the court of Flanders, becoming a favorite of Countess Margaret II of Flanders.

In 1248, Gilles accompanied the army of the Count of Flanders which participated in the Seventh Crusade. In 1250, Louis IX named him Constable of France, replacing Humbert V de Beaujeu, who had died in Syria. Gilles thus became a trusted officer of Louis IX.

After the crusade, Gilles returned to France, and married Simonette de Joinville, sister of the King's secretary and friend, the famed writer Jean de Joinville and received numerous lands for his service to the King. 1268, Margaret II of Flanders appointed him guardian to the young prince, Robert de Béthune, her grandson. Henceforth, he divided his time between Flanders, Hainaut, and France.

Gilles joined the expedition of Count Charles of Anjou in the conquest of the Kingdom of Sicily and even fought in the decisive Battle of Benevento. Gilles then returned to Hainaut. His old age prevented him from joining the Eighth Crusade in 1270. He died in 1276.
