= Nicholas Szécs =

Hungarian nobleman

Ispán of Komárom
- Reign: 1297
- Predecessor: Peter Aba
- Successor: Paul Szécs
- Died: 1297
- Noble family: gens Szécs
- Father: Paul

Nicholas from the kindred Szécs (Hungarian: Szécs nembeli Miklós), also known as Nicholas of Komárom (Hungarian: Komáromi Miklós; died 1297) was a Hungarian nobleman, who acted as lord of Komárom (today Komárno, Slovakia) together with his brother Paul since the 1280s.

== Career ==
Historians György Györffy and Krisztina Tóth identified him with that certain Nicholas, son of Paul, who served as ispán of Győr County just before Paul Szécs. As Nicholas and Paul always appeared in contemporary records together since the 1280s, it is presumable that they were brothers (or at least cousins). According to an undated royal charter by Ladislaus IV, possibly around 1286, the King authorized Lodomer, Archbishop of Esztergom to excommunicate Paul and Nicholas, if they would confiscate two-thirds part of the trade customs in Komárom which were entitled to the Bakonybél Abbey. That data confirmed they jointly owned Komárom Castle since the mid-1280s, possibly as familiares of the powerful Kőszegi family.

After 1296, King Andrew III, who intended to establish an alliance among the local noblemen against the oligarchs – most notably Matthew Csák and the Kőszegis, started negotiations with Nicholas and Paul, among others. As a result, the Szécs brothers left the Kőszegi allegiance and joined Andrew's partisans. Tóth argued Nicholas was appointed ispán of Győr and Komárom Counties after that, thus it is possible he was elder than his brother Paul. He first appeared in sources in this regard since January 1297. Nicholas served as an ad-litem judge during a lawsuit in the case of Óbecse (today Bečej in Serbia) in June 1297, along with Emeric, Bishop of Várad, Master of the treasury Dominic Rátót, Stephen Ákos and Voivode Roland Borsa. As these all persons were members of the alliance which struggled against Matthew Csák, historian Krisztina Tóth argued initially Nicholas would have been that lord with whom King Andrew intends to contract. However Nicholas died shortly afterwards, and his brother Paul became one of the five barons in 1298, who entered into a formal feudal alliance with their King against the oligarchs and the bishops' college.

== Sources ==
- Tóth, Krisztina (2011). "A Szécs nemzetség és rokoni kapcsolatai [The Szécs kindred and its Family Relationships]". Turul (in Hungarian). 84 (2). Magyar Heraldikai és Genealógiai Társaság: 37–42. ISSN 1216-7258.
- Zsoldos, Attila (2011). Magyarország világi archontológiája, 1000–1301 [Secular Archontology of Hungary, 1000–1301] (in Hungarian). História, MTA Történettudományi Intézete. ISBN 978-963-9627-38-3.

Nicholas Genus Szécs Born: ? Died: 1297
Political offices
Preceded by Ladislaus	Ispán of Győr; 1297	Succeeded by Paul Szécs
Preceded by Peter Aba	Ispán of Komárom; 1297	Succeeded by Paul Szécs
