= Lapo Gianni =

12th-century Italian poet

Lapo Gianni (died after 1328) was an Italian poet who lived in Florence in the 13th-14th centuries. He was a member of the Florentine circle of the Italian movement called Dolce Stil Novo.

== Biography ==
Born in Florence in the mid-1250s, Lapo Gianni was probably a notary. He was an intimate friend of Dante and Guido Cavalcanti and was associated politically with Dante during his priorate. Little further is known of him save that he belonged to the Ricevuti family and was still living in May, 1328, so that he survived both Dante and Cavalcanti. A number of his poems have been preserved, besides the register of his notarial acts for thirty years, from May 24, 1298, to May 24, 1328.

== Works ==
Lapo Gianni is the author of eleven ballate, three substantial canzoni (one of which rails against love), two independent canzone stanzas, and the famous extended double sonnet, ‘Amor, eo chero mia donna in domìno’ composed in the Provençal plazer style. The preference for ballate links him with Guido Cavalcanti and Gianni degli Alfani. Otherwise, he reworks dolce stil novo language and imagery in an ‘international Gothic style’, looking backwards in some ways and forwards to the 14th century in others.

Lapo Gianni is considered one of the founders of the dolce stil novo alongside Cavalcanti, Dante, and Cino. He is cited by Dante Alighieri in the famous 9th sonnet of the Rhymes. Dante considered him one of the best Tuscan poets of his age.
