= Cavalcante de' Cavalcanti =

Italian philosopher

Cavalcante de' Cavalcanti (flourished c. 1250; died c. 1280) was a Florentine philosopher and father of Guido Cavalcanti, a close friend of Dante Alighieri.

Cavalcanti was a wealthy member of the Guelph faction of Florentine aristocrats. He was a merchant banker who, with others, lent money under usurious conditions during the crusades with the consent and support of the papacy. In 1257 Cavalcanti served as Podestà (chief magistrate) of the Umbrian city of Gubbio. Following the 1260 victory of the Ghibellines over the Florentine Guelphs in the Battle of Montaperti, Cavalcanti went into exile in Lucca in Tuscany. He returned from exile in 1266 and married his son Guido to the daughter of Farinata degli Uberti, a prominent Ghibelline.

Despite Cavalcanti's alignment with the papacy-supporting Guelphs, he was denounced as a heretic. It is possible that he was an atheist, like his son.

In lines 52-72 of the tenth canto of Dante's Inferno, the poet converses with Cavalcanti about his son, Guido, and depicts the dead father as a doting parent. Dante represents Cavalcanti and Farinata as neighbors in the same tomb in Hell, but without any interaction between them.

== Biography ==
A member of the noble Guelphs and Ghibellines house of Cavalcanti, he was a rationalist and epicurean spirit. He did not believe in the immortality of the soul and maintained that the only reality was atoms.

Dante Alighieri meets him in the 10th canto of Inferno (Dante), where Heresy and Epicurus, such as Farinata degli Uberti, are placed in fiery arks to serve their eternal punishment. It was precisely with the latter, a Guelphs and Ghibellines, that Cavalcante had become related, as often happened in those days between opposing families when they wanted to reconcile: after the return of the Guelphs to Florence (1267), Guido, Cavalcante's son, had been made to marry Farinata's daughter, Bice Uberti. Also in the 10th canto of the Inferno, Cavalcante asks Dante for news of his son Guido, marveling at not seeing him in the Poet's company, if it is true that Alighieri's transcendental journey was due to “height of wit.” Indeed, Guido Cavalcanti was among the finest intelligences of 13th-century Florence, and “first friend” of Dante himself. Cavalcanti father died around 1280, when Dante was just 15 years old.

Cavalcante Cavalcanti also had another son, Pazzo, who was the great-grandfather of Filippo Cavalcanti, patriarch of the Cavalcantis of Calabria, who served as Barons of Sartano (nowadays known as Torano Castello) since 31 August 1363.

== Bibliography ==
- Hollander, Robert (2000). Dante: The Inferno. New York: Doubleday. pp. 180–182. ISBN 0-385-49697-4.
- Bolton Holloway, Julia Bolton, Julia (2005). "Bankers and their books". Sweet New Style: Brunetto Latino, Dante Alighieri, Geoffrey Chaucer, Essays, 1981-2005.
- Lansing, Richard, ed. (2000). The Dante Encyclopedia. New York: Garland. ISBN 0-8153-1659-3.
