= Manoel Victor Cavalcante =

Brazilian architect and politician (1958–2022)

Member of the Legislative Assembly of Santa Catarina
- In office 1991–1995

Personal details
- Born: 23 October 1958; Laguna, Santa Catarina, Brazil
- Died: 12 October 2022 (aged 63)
- Political party: PDT
- Occupation: Architect

Manoel Victor Cavalcante (23 October 1958 – 12 October 2022) was a Brazilian politician. A member of the Democratic Labour Party, he served in the Legislative Assembly of Santa Catarina from 1991 to 1995.

Cavalcante died on 12 October 2022, at the age of 63.
