= Joyce Cavalccante =

Brazilian journalist and author

Joyce Cavalccante is a Brazilian author of seven novels, plus several short stories and articles that today appear in eight anthologies. She is the president of REBRA, the Brazilian Women Writers' Network.

== Biography ==
Joyce Cavalccante was born in Fortaleza, state of Ceará, Brazil, on March 12, 1963. She is the third child of Ernesto Saboia de Figueirêdo and Albetisa Aguiar de Figueirêdo. She spent her childhood in the city of Sobral, precisely on the Jatobá farm owned by her parents. He moved to Fortaleza in his teens.

She adopted São Paulo as the city in which to live and develop her writing career. She is a novelist, short story writer, chronicler, petrologist and lecturer. She has published eight books of prose fiction individually, and participated in fifteen collections of short stories with other authors. She systematically contributes to the press, publishing short stories, reviews, articles and chronicles. For some time he has been giving lectures on literature at Brazilian and foreign universities. She is president of REBRA - Rede de Escritoras Brasileiras (Network of Brazilian Women Writers), a non-profit organization whose mission is to expand opportunities for women in Brazil.

== Published books ==
- The Devil Sucking Mango - Bertrand Brasil Publisher - 2001 - RJ - Novel.
- Intimate Enemies: No Sin South Of The Equator -IUniverse publisher - NYC. - 1st edition 2000. Novel. English translation by Leland Guyer.
- Intimate Enemies (Inimigas Intimas) - Novel - Maltese Publisher - São Paulo - Brazil - 1993 1st edition - 1994 2nd edition. Award Best Fiction 1993. Novel.
- Mystical Details (Retalhos Misticos) - Collection of Serigraphies and text with the artist Elvio Becheroni - John Doo Editor - São Paulo - Brazil - 1988. Short stories.
- The Discourse Of An Absurd Woman (O Discurso Da Mulher Absurda) - Short stories - Global Publisher - São Paulo - Brazil - 1985 1st edition - Maltese Publisher - São Paulo - Brazil - 1994 2nd edition.
- Free & Object (Livre E Objeto) - Poems in Prose - Massao Ohno Editions - São Paulo - Brazil - 1980.
- Eve's Rib (Costela De Eva) - Novel - Global Publisher - São Paulo - Brazil - 1980.
- From Within Outward (De Dentro Para Fora) - Novel - Referencia Publisher - São Paulo - Brazil- 1978.
- Brasiliansk Litteratur - Fran Urskog Till Megadtad - Anthology of Brazilian Literature - Fabians Forlag Publisher - Stockholm - Sweden - 1994.
- Letters On The Sun (Letras Ao Sol) - Anthology - Demócrito Rocha Foundation Editions - Fortaleza - Brazil - 1996.
- The Talent Of Ceara In Short Stories (O Talento Cearense Em Contos) - Anthology - Maltese Publisher/ SECULT - São Paulo - Brazil - 1996.
- Against Murmur (Contra Lamuria) - Anthology - Pindaíba Publisher House - São Paulo - Brazil - 1994.
- The Man Who Has A Fish Between His Legs (L'Uomo Che Aveva Un Pesce Fra Le Gambe) - Short story. Narrasud, scritti e percorsi migratori, revista bimestrale - anno I - n 2, pag. 42. Italy.
- Short Stories From Ceara Anthology (Antologia Do Conto Cearense) - Tukano Edition - Fortaleza, Brasil - 1990 - Anthology .
- The Other Side Of The Gaze (O Outro Lado Do Olhar). Verano Publisher - Brasília, Brazil - 1988 - Anthology.
- Paulistas Short Stories (Contos Paulistas) - Editora Mercado Aberto Publisher - Porto Alegre, Brasil - 1988 - Anthology.
- Pirandelian Short Stories (Contos Pirandelianos). Brasiliense Publisher- S.P. Brasil - 1985 - Anthology.
