= Vinodol, Nitra District =

Vinodol Nyitraszőlős
- Municipality
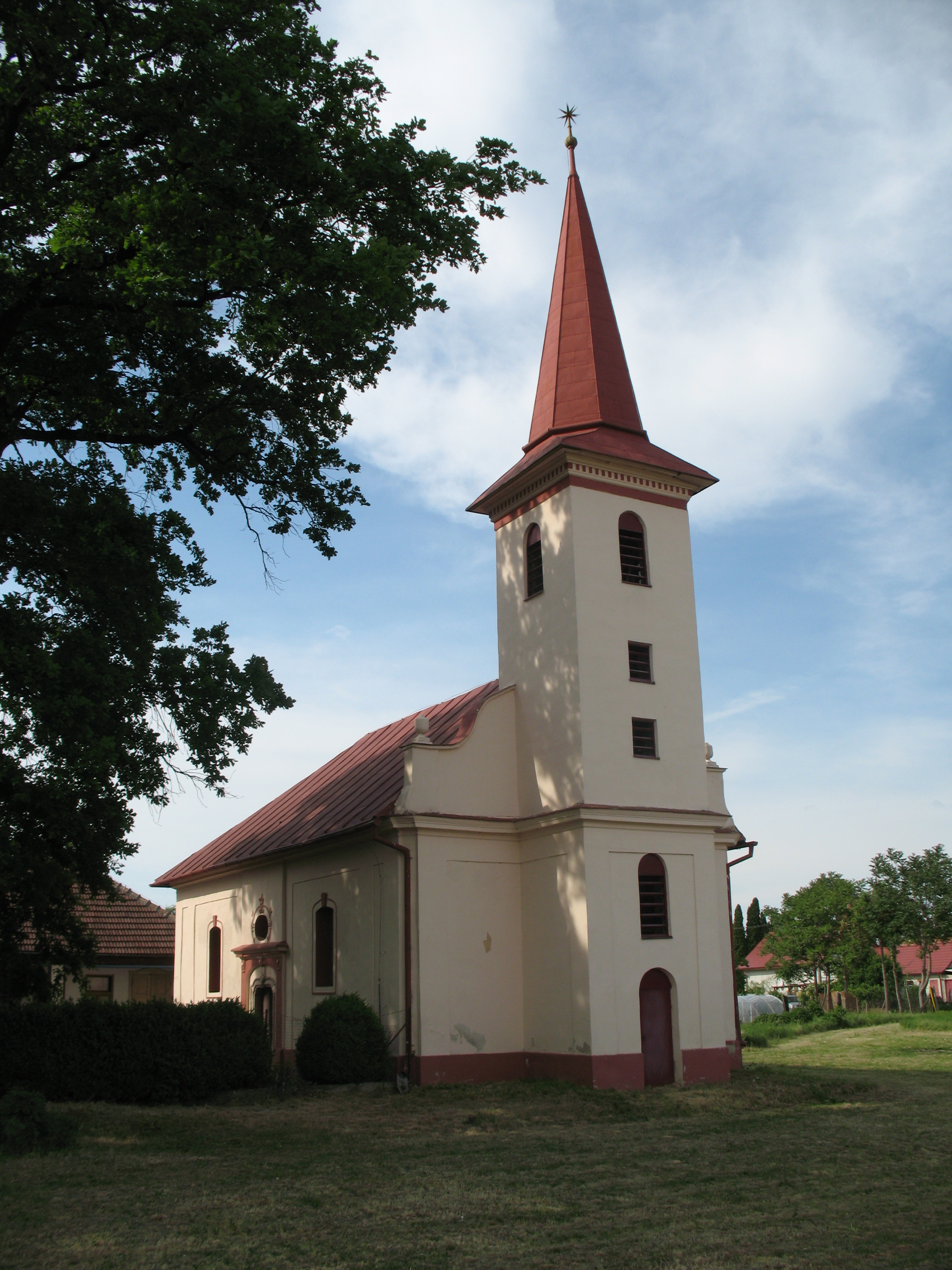
- Protestant church

- Flag Coat of arms

- Location of Vinodol in the Nitra Region Location of Vinodol in Slovakia
- Coordinates: 48°11′32″N 18°12′07″E
- Country: Slovakia
- Region: Nitra Region
- District: Nitra District
- First mentioned: 1113

Area
  - Total: 14.98 km^{2} (5.78 sq mi)
- Elevation: 130 m (430 ft)

Population (2025)
  - Total: 2,011
- Time zone: UTC+1 (CET)
  - Summer (DST): UTC+2 (CEST)
- Postal code: 951 06
- Area code: +421 37
- Vehicle registration plate (until 2022): NR
- Website: www.obec-vinodol.sk

Vinodol (Hungarian: Nyitraszőlős) is a village and municipality in the Nitra District in western central Slovakia, in the Nitra Region. It is mostly agricultural settlement.

== History ==
In historical records the village was first mentioned in 1113 (913 years ago).

== Geography ==
The municipality lies at an altitude of 130 metres (430 ft) and covers an area of 14.98 km^{2} (5.78 sq mi) (2025).

== Population ==
Population statistic (10 years)
Year	1995	2005	2015	2025
Count	1719	1910	1974	2011
Difference		+11.11%	+3.35%	+1.87%

Population statistic
Year	2024	2025
Count	2034	2011
Difference		−1.13%

It has a population of 2011 people (31 December 2025).

=== Ethnicity ===
Census 2021 (1+ %)
Ethnicity	Number	Fraction
Slovak	1967	95.43%
Romani	92	4.46%
Hungarian	53	2.57%
Not found out	51	2.47%
Total	2061	

In year 2021 was 2061 people by ethnicity 1967 as Slovak, 92 as Romani, 53 as Hungarian, 51 as Not found out, 10 as Czech, 7 as Other, 2 as Russian, 2 as Polish, 1 as Austrian, 1 as German and 1 as Albanian.

Note on population: The difference values of population numbers in the table "Population statistic" and in the sections "Ethnicity" & "Religion" is caused by the use of various statistical methods.

=== Religion ===
Census 2021 (1+ %)
Religion	Number	Fraction
Roman Catholic Church	1683	81.66%
None	226	10.97%
Not found out	55	2.67%
Calvinist Church	52	2.52%
Total	2061	

In year 2021 was 2061 people by religion 1683 from Roman Catholic Church, 226 from None, 55 from Not found out, 52 from Calvinist Church, 14 from Evangelical Church, 6 from Greek Catholic Church, 5 from Old Catholic Church, 5 from Ad hoc movements, 4 from Christian Congregations in Slovakia, 2 from Jehovah's Witnesses, 2 from Other, 2 from Hinduism, 1 from Eastern Orthodox Church, 1 from Islam, 1 from Seventh-day Adventist Church, 1 from Buddhism and 1 from Baptists Church.
