= Giovanni Cavalcanti (chronicler) =

Among several members of the extended Florentine patrician family the Cavalcanti holding the name Giovanni, the chronicler Giovanni Cavalcanti (1381-c.1451), of a minor branch of the family but who was captain of the Guelph party in 1422, is most widely remembered for his malevolent and melancholic account of Florence, covering the period 1420-47. Cavalcanti's Storie obsessively focussed on the city's political intrigues and scandals and was colored by his personal political misfortunes as an aristocratic agitator, first against the corrupt oligarchy of 1420-34 and subsequently of the Medici; his long imprisonment for debt excluded him from the participation in public life that he considered his noble right.

Historians had discounted the decayed grande, Cavalcanti, who was rehabilitated by Claudio Varese, 1961. In private he was also the author of a Trattato politico-morale, written in the 1440s and dedicated to the anti-Medicean Neri Capponi; it was intended as a Ciceronian moral guide to family morality and a nostalgic account of lost, pre-Medicean civic virtues, offered with Roman parallels, intended for Neri's young son.
