= Francesco de Vieri =

Italian philosopher (1524–1591)

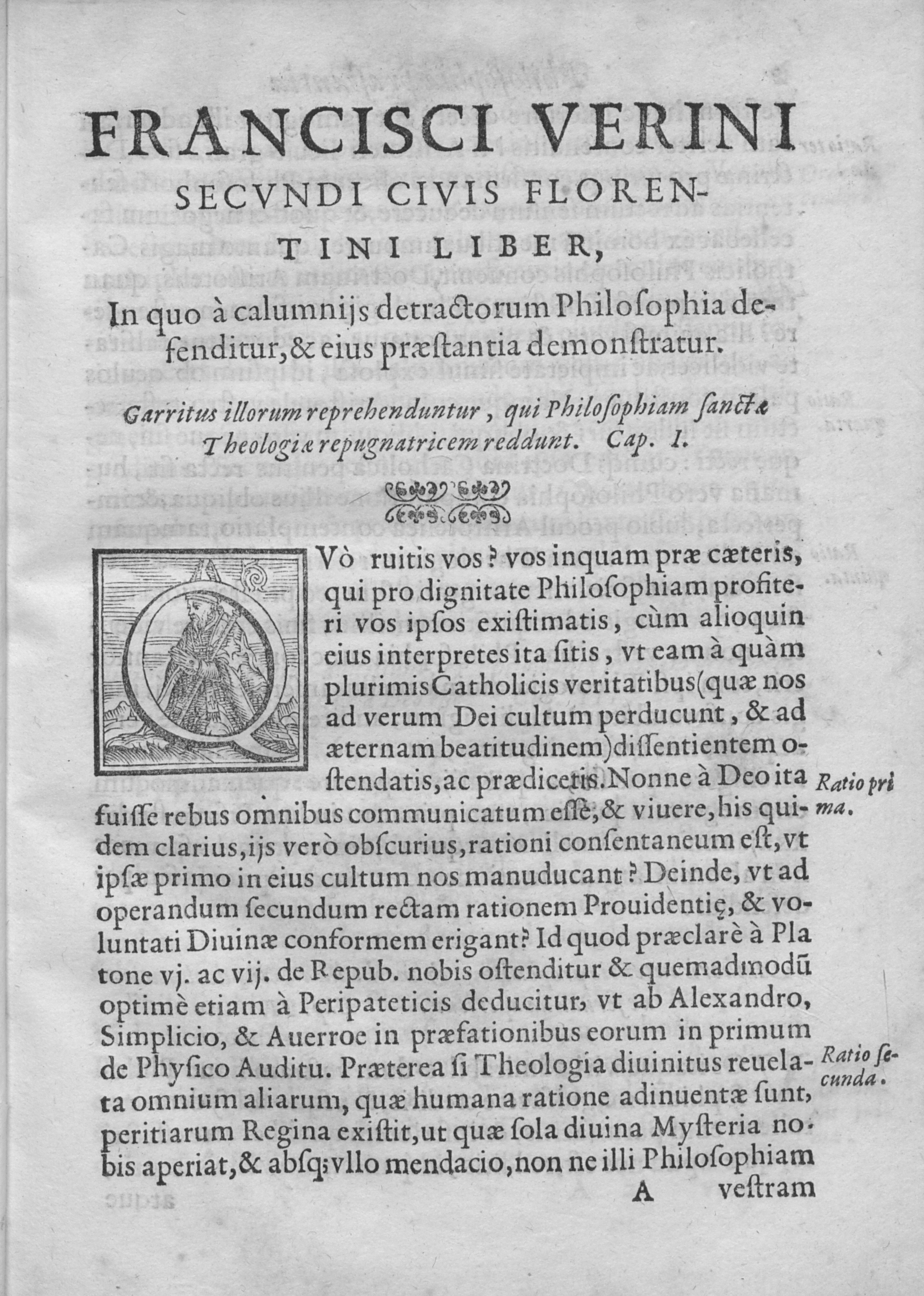
First page of the Liber (1586)

Francesco de' Vieri, also known as Verino the Second (1524–1591), was an Italian philosopher.

He was the nephew of "Verino the First" Francesco de' Vieri. Like his homonymous ancestor, he was professor of logic and philosophy at the University of Pisa, and actively involved in the Accademia Fiorentina.

He was criticized by colleagues for his longing for a new Platonic Academy following Giovanni Pico della Mirandola. His main opponent was Girolamo Borro.

== Works ==
- Liber, in quo a calumnijs detractorum philosophia defenditur, & eius praestantia demonstratur (in Latin). Rome: Giovanni Angelo Ruffinelli. 1586.
