= Jenő Szűcs =

Hungarian historian (1928–1988)

Jenő Szűcs (July 13, 1928 – November 24, 1988) was a Hungarian historian who was born in Debrecen and died in Leányfalu. He focused on the regions and development of Europe and how the regions of East and West both subsequently affected each other to their modern form.
