= Battle of Benevento =

Battle between the troops of Charles of Anjou and Manfred of Sicily

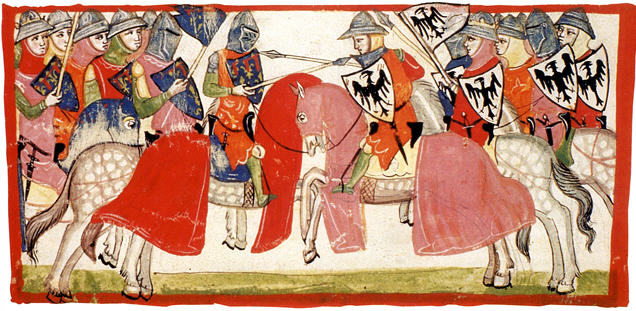
- Miniature depicting the Battle of Benevento; Nuova Cronica Vatican Library Chig.L.VIII.296
Date	26 February 1266
Location	River Calore, near Benevento, present-day Italy 41°08′03″N 14°46′24″E
Result	Decisive Guelph victory

Belligerents
Guelphs: House of Anjou; House of Capet	Ghibellines: House of Hohenstaufen

Commanders and leaders
Charles of Anjou: Hugh of Mirepoix; Philip of Montfort; Gilles de Trasignies	Manfred of Sicily †: Count of Anglano; Giordano d'Anglano; Count Galvan; Count Bartholomew; Theobald Anibaldi

Strength
12,000 men: 600 knights; 2,400 men-at-arms and mounted sergeants; 600 crossbowmen; 8,400 infantry	13,500–14,000 men: 1,200 German mercenary knights and men-at-arms; 1,000–1,400 Italo-Norman knights and men-at-arms; 1,000 Italian mercenary horsemen; 300–400 Saracen light cavalry; 10,000 Saracen archers

Casualties and losses
Unknown but comparatively light	Most of the army: Only 600 of the 3,600 armoured cavalrymen escaped death or capture; Annihilation of the Saracen corps

The Battle of Benevento was a major medieval battle fought on 26 February 1266, near Benevento in present-day Southern Italy, between the forces of Charles I of Anjou and those of King Manfred of Sicily. Manfred's defeat and death resulted in Charles' conquest of the Kingdom of Sicily, effectively ending the rule of the Hohenstaufen dynasty in the Italian Peninsula and marking the rise of the royal Capetian House of Anjou. The engagement was part of the conflict which pitted Guelphs against Ghibellines.

== Background ==
The Papacy had long been in conflict with the Imperial house of Hohenstaufen over their rule in Italy. At the time of the battle, the Hohenstaufen ruler of the Kingdom of Sicily (which included Sicily and southern Italy) was Manfred, illegitimate son of Frederick II, Holy Roman Emperor. However, the rightful heir to the kingdom was Frederick's legitimate 14-year-old grandson Conradin, living with his uncle and guardian Louis II, Duke of Bavaria. Manfred, acting as regent since 1254, took advantage of a false rumor of Conradin's death and usurped the throne in 1258. Pope Urban IV determined to take the Kingdom from him, and in 1263, concluded a secret treaty with Charles, promising him the Sicilian throne. After Pope Urban's death in October 1264, Pope Clement IV continued his predecessor's support for Charles.

== Prelude ==
Charles reached Rome in May 1265, but was temporarily halted by the need to obtain financing for his military operations. Manfred, however, instead of vigorously taking countermeasures, spent his time hunting. He obviously assumed that the Ghibellines in the northern Italian cities would already have stopped the advance of the enemy. For the rest he trusted the fighting strength of his German knights and Saracen horsemen. He did not take the field against him until January 1266, when Charles' main army had crossed the Alps. Alarmed by the ease with which many towns and castles surrendered to the French and by desertions among his followers, Manfred sought to bring Charles to battle as swiftly as possible, fearing further treachery. Charles attempted to turn Manfred's position at Capua by a perilous crossing of the Apennines which wrecked his supply line; but Manfred had intelligence of his move and waited in a strong position across the River Calore, which could only be crossed by a single bridge.

=== Ghibelline forces ===
Manfred's army was composed of very heterogeneous elements. His infantry was essentially composed of Saracen archers set up in the fore. Behind them was his first battle, the best of his troops, consisting of 1,200 German mercenary knights and men-at-arms, clad not only in the usual mail-shirt and gambeson, but also coats of plates, a type of armour that was just beginning to come into fashion. They were commanded by his cousin Giordano d'Anglano and Galvano of Anglona. The second battle consisted of around 1,000 Italian mercenary cavalry and 300 to 400 Saracen light horsemen, commanded by his uncle Galvano Lancia. The third battle consisted of the barons of Manfred's kingdom, and numbered 1,400 knights and men-at-arms, under his personal command. Manfred stayed with the Italo-Norman noblemen and they did not form his reserve for nothing. He distrusted them.

Manfred's forces enjoyed a slight numerical superiority and a strong defensive position across the Calore.

=== Guelph forces ===
Charles' army consisted of 600 mounted knights, 2,400 men-at-arms and mounted sergeants, 600 crossbowmen, 3,900 heavy infantry and 4,500 light infantry, totalling around 12,000 men. It was probably above all the prospect of loot that prompted numerous French nobles to come to Lyon, where Charles had assembled his army in autumn 1265.

His cavalry was also divided into three battles. The first battle consisted of 900 Provençal knights and sergeants commanded by Marshal of France Hugh of Mirepoix and Philip of Montfort, Lord of Castres. Behind them was the second battle, which consisted of 1,000 knights and men-at-arms from Southern and Central France under the personal command of Charles; their chiefs were the Count of Vendôme, the Bishop of Auxerre, Guy de Monfort, Peter de Beaumont and Guy de Mello. Finally, the third battle consisted of men from Northern France and Flanders under Grand Constable Gilles de Trasignies and Robert of Béthune, the heir of the county of Flanders. In addition, the invaders numbered 400 Italian men-at-arms of the Guelf faction led by the Florentine Guido Guerra. It is unknown where exactly they stood; apparently they were not in the reserve but struck in with the second line at the moment of contact. Charles ordered his men-at-arms to have a couple of foot soldiers behind them whose task would be to aid the horsemen of his army in case they were dismounted and to slay those of the enemy who were overthrown. The rest of the infantry and crossbowmen were thrown in front of the line to skirmish with their Saracen counterparts.

Charles had the advantage of leading an army which was practically homogeneous; save the few Italians, all were vassals of the French and Provençal crowns. In addition, beyond the low esteem in which both sides held their foot-soldiery, Charles' horsemen were fairly equal to each other in military worth, something Manfred did not have the luck to benefit from.

== Battle ==
The battle began in the morning when Manfred sent his Saracens forward. Charles' infantry and crossbowmen advanced to meet them but were driven back by the foot-archers and light cavalry. The Saracens, however, having left themselves exposed in the open were charged by Provençal sergeants of Charles' first line and swiftly overwhelmed. It is not known whether they acted rashly or if they were ordered to do so by Manfred but the German knights and men-at-arms who formed his first battle crossed the bridge and moved up to attack the Provençal cavalry. The Germans had at first the upper hand. They enjoyed a slight numerical advantage, were heavier men on heavier horses and their armor was quite impenetrable to the strokes of their opponents. They slowly but effectively pushed the Provençals before them and Charles felt compelled to commit his second battle to aid the first. Accordingly, the French knights charged and with them his 400 Italians as well. Outnumbered, the Germans still held out gallantly; they seemed invulnerable to the French swords as their armor kept repelling all blows. But the enemy had soon discovered the weak point of their equipment. According to the chronicle of Andrew of Hungary, some sharp-eyed French knight noted that the new plate armor, which was still in its infancy, did not protect their armpits when the arm was lifted to strike. Closing in and wedging themselves between the somewhat shaken ranks of the German heavy cavalry, the shorter and more acutely pointed blades of the French horsemen were much more effective in close quarters than the German longswords. In a few minutes, a considerable number of Germans were mortally wounded. Overwhelmed and broken, the whole corps was practically annihilated.

The tide had now evidently turned against Manfred. The long time spent crossing the narrow bridge meant a very wide space arose between his first corps, which had prematurely charged, and his second, which he had deployed to assist them. By the time Manfred's second battle arrived to aid the Germans, they had been cut to pieces and they themselves were now in a precarious situation as Charles had already ordered his third battle to charge them. While some did so from the front, others swept round their flanks and beset them from the rear. Shaken in spirit by the sight of what the French had done to the Germans, they made a very poor resistance; seeing themselves about to be surrounded, they broke and attempted to flee but most were slain. Realizing defeat was imminent, most of the nobles in Manfred's third corps deserted, leaving the king to his fate. Manfred was now left with a choice himself: death or instant flight. His undaunted spirit led him to take the first alternative. After exchanging the royal surcoat with his friend Tebaldo Annibaldi to whom he had also given his royal armor prior to the battle as not to attract too much notice in the mêlée, Manfred closed up with the few faithful of his followers left and rode straight into the midst of the enemy. He found the death that he sought. The battle saw the French give little quarter; only a few prisoners were taken, the most notable being Giordano Lancia and his cousin, Count Bartolommeo. The river was at the back of the fugitives and only the bridge was safe; those who tried to swim the flooded Calore in their heavy mail were mostly drowned.

Only 600 of Manfred's 3,600 heavy cavalrymen managed to escape death or capture. Also, the Saracens had fought as mercenaries for Holy Roman Emperors since Frederick II Hohenstaufen planted a colony of some 35,000 Saracens near Lucera. For many decades, this colony had provided the German emperors with 5,000 archers per year. The unit was wiped out at Benevento.

== Aftermath ==
The destruction of Manfred's army marked the collapse of Hohenstaufen rule in Italy. The remainder of the Kingdom of Sicily was conquered almost without resistance. Settled in his new kingdom, Charles awaited the coming of Conradin, the last hope of the Hohenstaufen, in 1268, and met him at the Battle of Tagliacozzo.

== Sources ==
- Runciman, Steven (2000). The Sicilian Vespers. Cambridge University Press. ISBN 0-521-43774-1.
- Spaulding, Oliver Lyman and Hoffman Nickerson (1993). Ancient and Medieval Warfare. Barnes & Noble. ISBN 1-56619-241-2.
