= Giovanni Cavalcanti (poet) =

Italian poet

Giovanni Cavalcanti (1444–1509) was an Italian poet from Florence, a member of the Platonic Academy of Florence that met in the Villa Medici at Careggi under the guidance of Marsilio Ficino.

Ficino and Cavalcanti were particular friends: Giovanni Cavalcanti lived for many years with Ficino at his villa, and Marsilio dedicated his essay De amore (1484) to Cavalcanti, who had urged him to compose it. Ficino introduced the concept of "Platonic love" and addressed many letters to his Giovanni amico mio perfettisimo ("Giovanni my most perfect friend").
