= Chotín =

Chotín Hetény
- Municipality
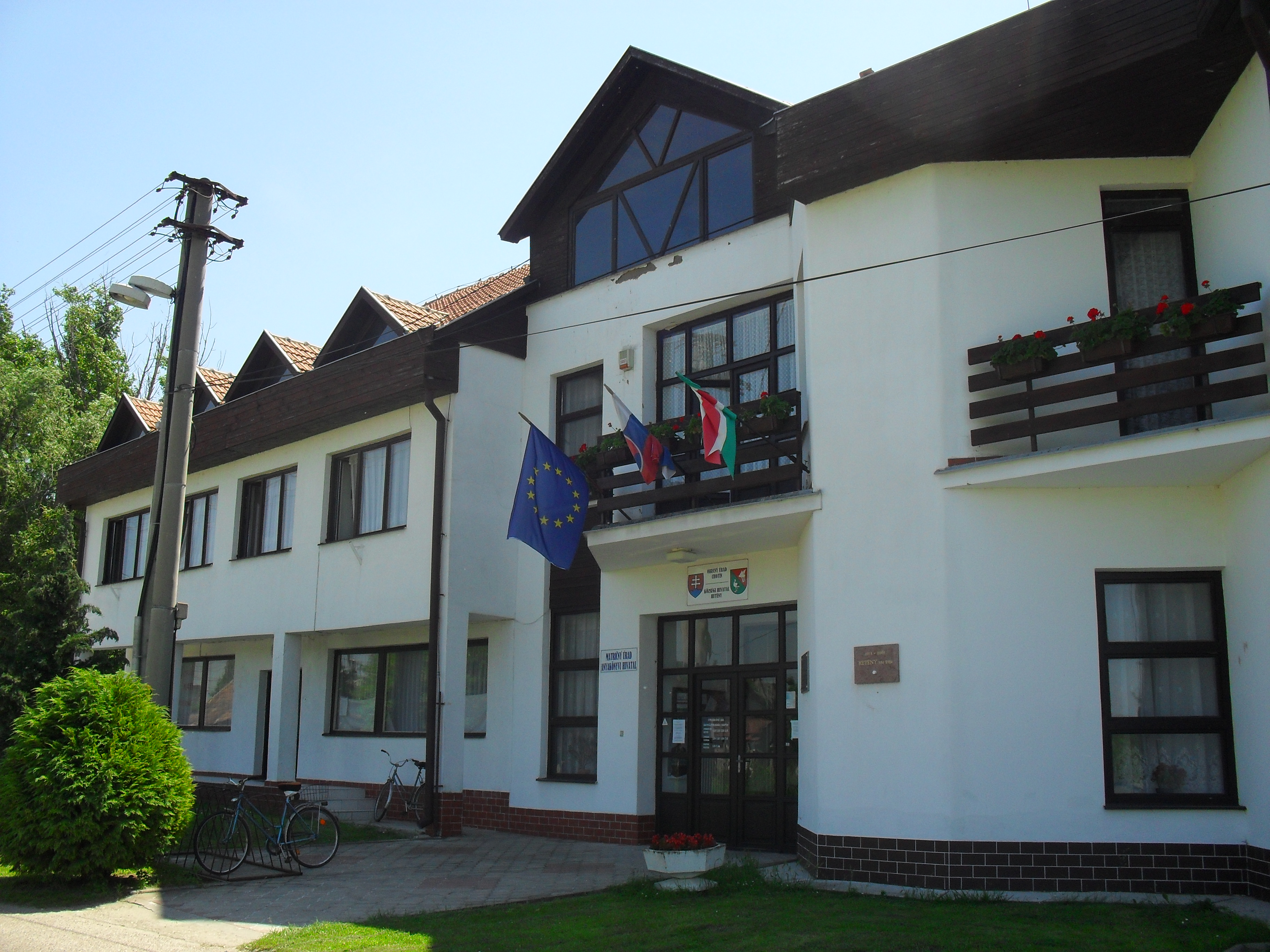
- Municipal office

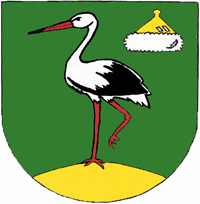
- Flag Coat of arms

- Location of Chotín in the Nitra Region Location of Chotín in Slovakia
- Coordinates: 47.80°N 18.23°E
- Country: Slovakia
- Region: Nitra Region
- District: Komárno District
- First mentioned: 1138

Government
  - Mayor: František Magyari (MOST-HÍD)

Area
  - Total: 20.42 km^{2} (7.88 sq mi)
- Elevation: 110 m (360 ft)

Population (2025)
  - Total: 1,390
- Time zone: UTC+1 (CET)
  - Summer (DST): UTC+2 (CEST)
- Postal code: 946 31
- Area code: +421 35
- Vehicle registration plate (until 2022): KN
- Website: www.chotin.sk

Chotín (Hungarian: Hetény, Hungarian pronunciation:[ˈhɛteːɲ]) is a village and municipality in the Komárno District in the Nitra Region of south-western Slovakia.

== Geography ==
The municipality lies at an altitude of 110 metres (360 ft) and covers an area of 20.42 km^{2} (7.88 sq mi) (2025).

== History ==
In the 9th century, the territory of Chotín became part of the Kingdom of Hungary. In historical records the village was first mentioned in 1138. After the Austro-Hungarian army disintegrated in November 1918, Czechoslovak troops occupied the area, later acknowledged internationally by the Treaty of Trianon. Between 1938 and 1945 Chotín once more became part of Miklós Horthy's Hungary through the First Vienna Award. From 1945 until the Velvet Divorce, it was part of Czechoslovakia. Since then it has been part of Slovakia.

== Population ==
Population statistic (10 years)
Year	1995	2005	2015	2025
Count	1465	1415	1373	1390
Difference		−3.41%	−2.96%	+1.23%

Population statistic
Year	2024	2025
Count	1385	1390
Difference		+0.36%

It has a population of 1390 people (31 December 2025).

=== Ethnicity ===
Census 2021 (1+ %)
Ethnicity	Number	Fraction
Hungarian	1160	84.36%
Slovak	194	14.1%
Not found out	78	5.67%
Total	1375	

In year 2021 was 1375 people by ethnicity 1160 as Hungarian, 194 as Slovak, 78 as Not found out, 4 as Czech, 3 as German, 2 as Ukrainian, 1 as Romani, 1 as Russian, 1 as Korean and 1 as Albanian.

Note on population: The difference values of population numbers in the table "Population statistic" and in the sections "Ethnicity" & "Religion" is caused by the use of various statistical methods.

=== Religion ===
Census 2021 (1+ %)
Religion	Number	Fraction
Calvinist Church	673	48.95%
None	307	22.33%
Roman Catholic Church	263	19.13%
Not found out	81	5.89%
Evangelical Church	21	1.53%
Greek Catholic Church	16	1.16%
Total	1375	

In year 2021 was 1375 people by religion 673 from Calvinist Church, 307 from None, 263 from Roman Catholic Church, 81 from Not found out, 21 from Evangelical Church, 16 from Greek Catholic Church, 4 from Jehovah's Witnesses, 3 from Other and not ascertained christian church, 2 from Ad hoc movements, 1 from Old Catholic Church, 1 from Eastern Orthodox Church, 1 from Christian Congregations in Slovakia, 1 from Other and 1 from Buddhism.

== Facilities ==
The village has a public library, a gym and a football pitch.

== Genealogical resources ==
The records for genealogical research are available at the state archive "Statny Archiv in Nitra, Slovakia"

- Roman Catholic church records (births/marriages/deaths): 1722-1901 (parish B)
- Reformated church records (births/marriages/deaths): 1828-1952 (parish A)

== See also ==
- List of municipalities and towns in Slovakia
