= List of Italian-language poets =

List of poets who wrote in Italian (or Italian dialects).

== A ==
- Antonio Abati
- The Abbot of Tivoli
- Luigi Alamanni
- Aleardo Aleardi
- Dante Alighieri
- Cecco Angiolieri
- Gabriele D'Annunzio
- Ludovico Ariosto
- Francis of Assisi

== B ==
- Nanni Balestrini
- Dario Bellezza
- Giuseppe Gioacchino Belli (Roman dialect)
- Attilio Bertolucci
- Carlo Betocchi
- Alberta Bigagli
- Giovanni Boccaccio
- Maria Alinda Bonacci Brunamonti
- Carlo Bordini
- Franco Buffoni
- Michelangelo Buonarroti
- Helle Busacca
- Ignazio Buttitta (Sicilian language)
- Paolo Buzzi

== C ==
- Nanni Cagnone
- Dino Campana
- Giorgio Caproni
- Giosuè Carducci
- Roberto Carifi
- Guido Cavalcanti
- Gabriello Chiabrera
- Cino da Pistoia
- Compagnetto da Prato

== D ==
- Cielo d'Alcamo
- Chiaro Davanzati
- Fabrizio De André
- Milo de Angelis
- Lauro De Bosis
- Antonio De Santis (Italian and Larinese dialect)
- Eugenio De Signoribus
- Georges Dumitresco (Italian poetry in Triptic)

== E ==
- Muzi Epifani

== F ==
- Caterina Franceschi Ferrucci
- Alba Florio
- Franco Fortini
- Ugo Foscolo
- Erminia Fuà Fusinato

== G ==
- Alfonso Gatto
- Giuseppe Giusti
- Corrado Govoni
- Guido Gozzano
- Lionello Grifo
- Giovanni Battista Guarini
- Amalia Guglielminetti
- Margherita Guidacci
- Guido Guinizzelli
- Guittone d'Arezzo

== I ==
- Gianni Ianuale

== L ==
- Brunetto Latini
- Giacomo da Lentini
- Jacopo da Leona
- Giacomo Leopardi
- Mario Luzi
- Franco Loi

== N ==
- Giampiero Neri

== M ==
- Lorenzo il Magnifico (sovereign of Florence)
- Valerio Magrelli
- Alessandro Manzoni
- Filippo Tommaso Marinetti
- Giambattista Marino
- Domenico Antonio Mele
- Alda Merini
- Metastasio (Pietro Trapassi)
- Grazyna Miller
- Eugenio Montale (Nobel Prize in Literature, 1975)
- Vincenzo Monti
- Marino Moretti
- Maurizio Moro

== O ==
- Bonagiunta Orbicciani

== P ==
- Elio Pagliarani
- Aldo Palazzeschi
- Giuseppe Parini
- Giovanni Pascoli
- Pier Paolo Pasolini
- Nicoletta Pasquale
- Cesare Pavese
- Giovanni Peruzzini
- Francesco Petrarca (Petrarch)
- Assunta Pieralli
- Pietro della Vigna
- Poliziano (Angelo Ambrogini)
- Lorenzo Da Ponte
- Antonio Porta (author)
- Carlo Porta
- Antonia Pozzi
- Ezra Pound (Italian, English, and others)
- Luigi Pulci (1432–84)

== Q ==
- Salvatore Quasimodo

== R ==
- Giovanni Raboni
- Mary de Rachewiltz
- Clemente Rebora
- Amelia Rosselli
- Gabriele Rossetti
- Tiziano Rossi

== S ==
- Umberto Saba
- Giulio Salvadori
- Edoardo Sanguineti
- Leonardo Sinisgalli
- Maria Luisa Spaziani

== T ==
- Rosa Taddei
- Torquato Tasso
- Laura Terracina
- Giovanni Testori
- Jacopone da Todi
- Trilussa (Carlo Alberto Salustri) (Roman dialect)
- Theodor Daubler

== U ==
- Giuseppe Ungaretti

== V ==
- Diego Valeri (poet)
- Emilio Villa

== Z ==
- Andrea Zanzotto

== See also ==
- List of Italian writers
