= Settecamini =

- Zona of Rome
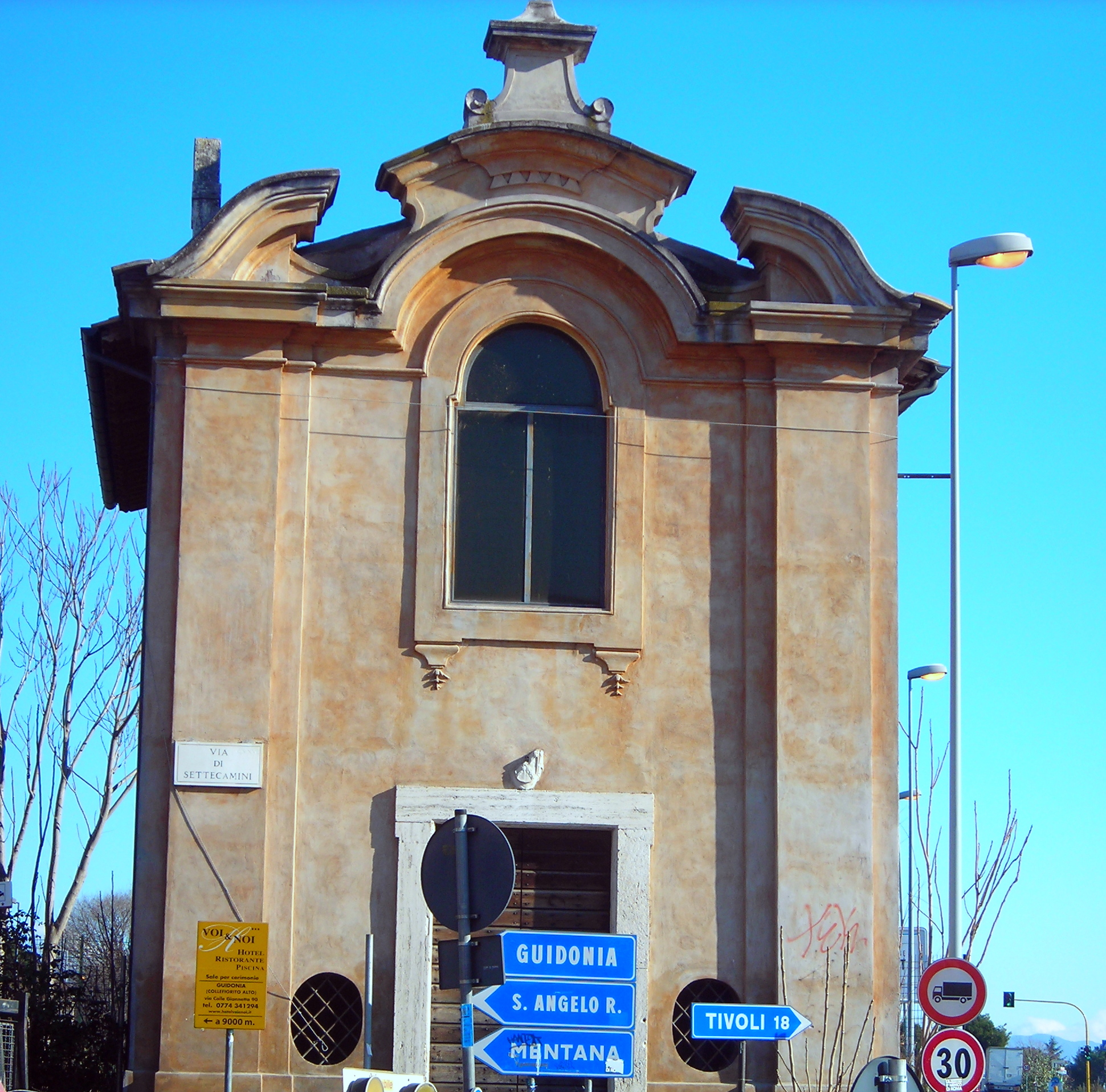
- The church of San Francesco (18th century)
- Interactive map of Settecamini
- Country: Italy
- Region: Lazio
- Province: Rome
- Comune: Rome

Area
  - Total: 8.3444 sq mi (21.6120 km^{2})

Population (2016)
  - Total: 23,027
  - Density: 2,759.6/sq mi (1,065.47/km^{2})
- Time zone: UTC+1 (CET)
  - Summer (DST): UTC+2 (CEST)

Settecamini is the 6th zona of Rome, identified by the initials Z. VI.. Settecamini is also the name of the urban zone 5L, within the Municipio V of Rome.

== History ==
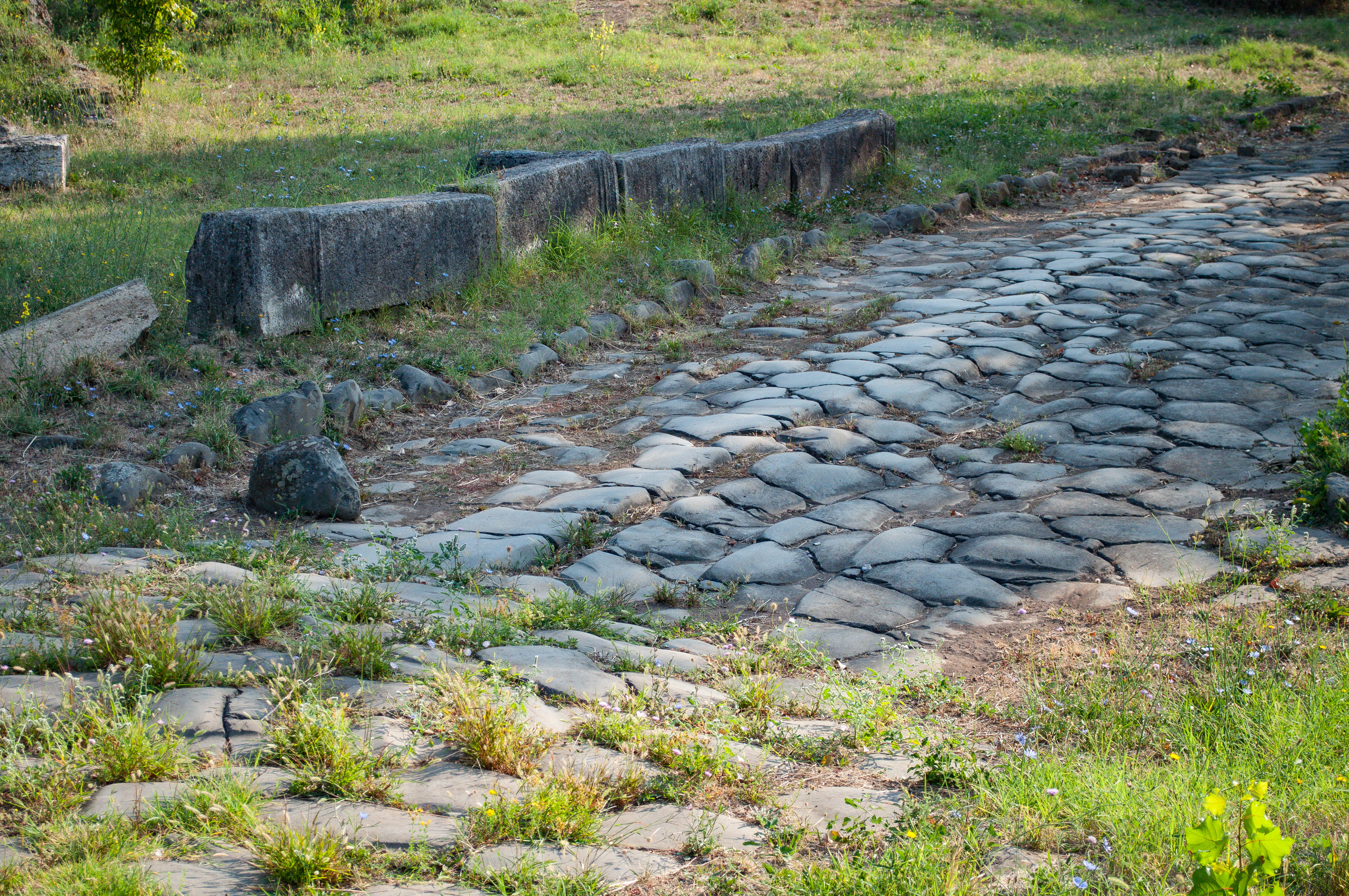
Via Tiburtina Valeria

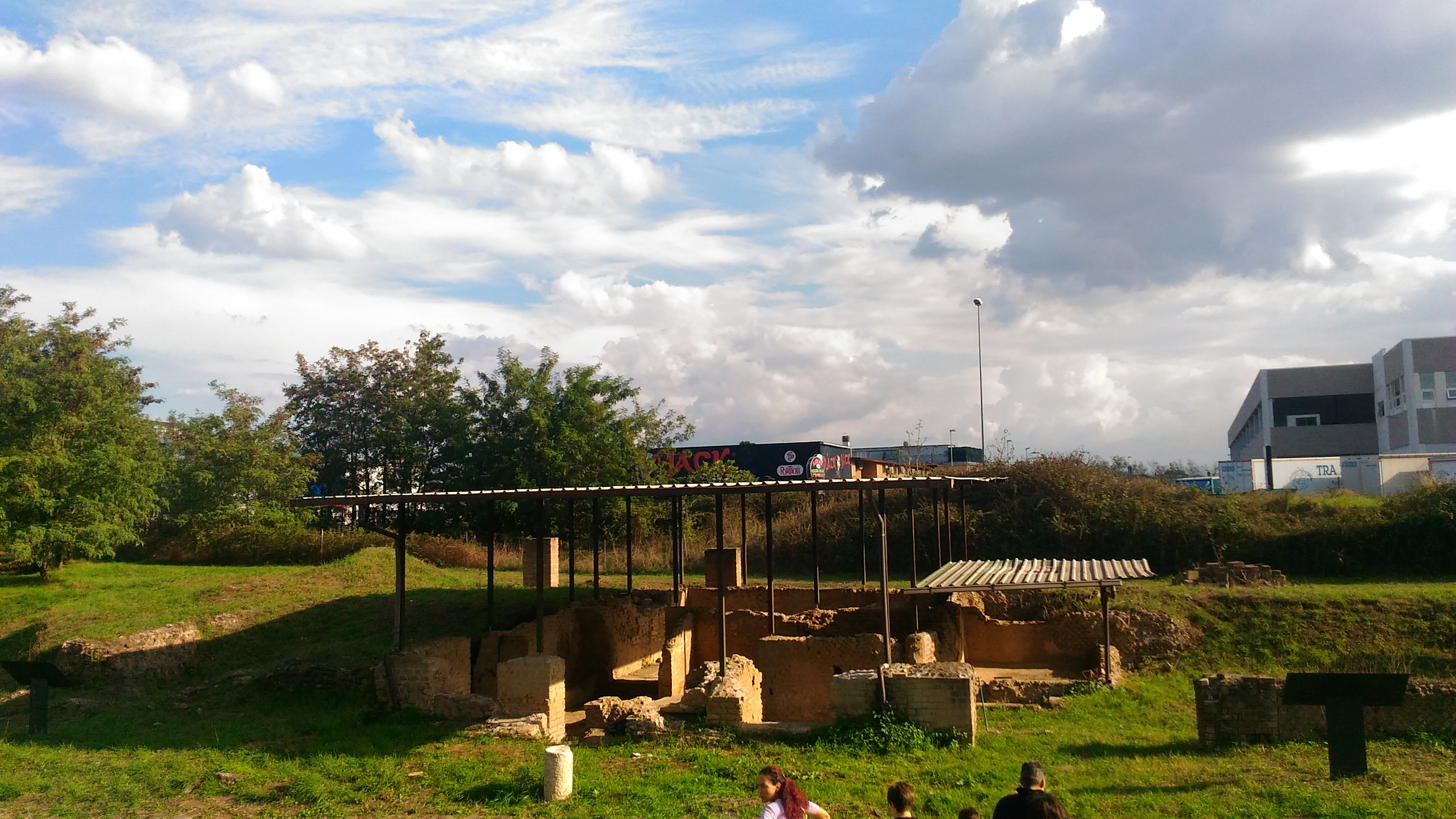
Area archeologica di Settecamini

The first settlements in the area can be dated to the Roman Republican era: the neighbourhood developed around the Via Tiburtina Roman road and a crossroads, and included two Roman inns and many Roman villas and tombs.

In the Middle Age, the locality was called Campo dei Sette Fratelli ("Field of the Seven Brothers") or Forno dei Septe Fratri ("Oven of the Seven Brothers"): both names were related to the legend of Saint Symphorosa and her seven children, (Crescens, Eugenius, Julian, Justin, Nemesius, Primitivus and Stracteus), martyred in the near Tibur (present Tivoli, Lazio, Italy) toward the end of the reign of the Roman Emperor Hadrian.

Later, it was called simply Forno ("Oven") or Osteria del Forno ("Tavern of the Oven"), in reference to a farmstead located south of Via Tiburtina, which is currently known as Casale di Settecamini. The current toponym Settecamini began to be used in the second half of the 19th century, and the Rome municipality toponymic dictionary states that it derived from "the seven chimneys ("sette camini") of the building known as Il Fornaccio.

A small church, in late Baroque style, was built in 1700 at the crossroads between Via Tiburtina and Via Casal Bianco.

The modern settlement developed as a rural village at the beginning of the twentieth century, on some lands owned by the Duke Leopoldo Torlonia. Later, some houses were assigned to the First World War veterans. The inhabited area has now an extension of 21.612 km^{2} and a population of about 19,000 inhabitants.

=== The archaeological area of Settecamini ===
Discovered in 1951 it is located at 9th mile of the Tiburtina (whose ancient pavement is visible), halfway between Rome and Tibur (Tivoli), where the Via Tiburtina crossed the road that led from the Aniene river to Etruria and Sabina. It was a settlement with several buildings and monumental tombs.

The first paleo-Christian building inserted in a pagan temple dates to around the 1st century BC. There is a courtyard with a central well, which is accessed from two side entrances. It was a residential area until the 5th century.

The building in the best condition is the "mansio", probably an inn for travellers, which has a mosaic from the imperial age. The building appears to have been in use from the 1st century BC to the 5th century AD and may have performed various functions over time.

== Geography ==
Settecamini is located in the eastern part of the city, near the Grande Raccordo Anulare, and borders the municipality of Guidonia Montecelio.

The territory of Settecamini includes the urban zones 5L Settecamini and 5I Sant'Alessandro.

=== Boundaries ===
To the north, Settecamini borders with Zona Tor San Giovanni (Z. V), whose boundary is marked by the stretch of Via Nomentana between the Grande Raccordo Anulare and Via Palombarense.

Eastward, the zona shares the border with the municipality of Guidonia Montecelio, up to the river Aniene.

Southward, Settecamini borders with Zona Lunghezza (Z. X) and with Zona Acqua Vergine (Z. IX): the border is outlined by the river Aniene, up to the Grande Raccordo Anulare.

To the west, Settecamini borders with Zona Tor Cervara (Z. VII), whose boundary is marked by the stretch of the Grande Raccordo Anulare between the Aniene and Via Tiburtina, and with Quartiere San Basilio (Q. XXX), whose boundary is marked by the GRA itself, up to Via Nomentana.

=== Historical subdivisions ===
The frazioni of Case Rosse and the urban areas of Casal Monastero and Sant'Alessandro belong to Settecamini.

=== Odonymy ===
In the area of Casal Monastero, along the Via Nomentana, streets and squares are named after ancient and modern cities of Sabina and personalities related to that region (which was the terminus of the Via Nomentana), while other odonyms in the area near to the Via Tiburtina refers to the ancient history of Tivoli. Other streets and squares are chiefly dedicated to medieval authors, municipalities of Abruzzo and Molise (in the frazione of Case Rosse) and to engineers and scientists (in the area of Tecnopolo). Odonyms of the zone can be categorized as follows:

- Industrialists, e.g. Via Giovanni Armenise, Largo Filippo Fratalocchi, Via Adriano Olivetti, Via Giacomo Peroni;
- Local toponyms, e.g. Via di Casal Bianco, Via delle Case Rosse, Via Fondi di Monastero, Via Forno Casale, Via Osteria delle Capannacce, Via di Salone, Via di Sant'Alessandro, Via di Settecamini, Viale del Tecnopolo;
- Medieval authors, e.g. Via Abate di Tivoli, Via Bonagiunta Orbicciani da Lucca, Via Bonvesin da la Riva, Via Cielo d'Alcamo, Via Lanfranco Cigala, Largo Chiaro Davanzati, Via Giacomo da Lentini, Via Re Enzo, Via Sordello da Goito, Via Stefano Protonotaro;
- Names related to Sabina: Ancient settlements, e.g. Via Cenina, Via Corniculum, Via Crustumerium, Viale Eretum and Via Nomentum; Modern settlements, e.g. Via Acuto, Via Belmonte in Sabina, Via Castelchiodato, Via Castelnuovo di Farfa, Via Costa Marcellana, Via Monteleone Sabino, Via Poggio Fidoni, Via Pozzaglia Sabino, Via Rocca di Cave, Via Terelle; Mythology, e.g. Viale Ratto delle Sabine; Personalities, e.g. Via Crescenzio Conte di Sabina, Via Gregorio da Catino, Via Massimiliano di Palombara, Via Poppea Sabina, Via Tersilia la Divina, Via Troilo il Grande;
- Names related to Tivoli, e.g. Via Coponia, Via Cossinia, Via Faustiniana, Via Plancina, Via Popilia, Via Quintiliolo, Via Rubellia, Via Saccomuro, Via San Getullo, Via della Sibilla Tiburtina;
- Towns of Abruzzo, e.g. Largo Alba Adriatica, Via Archi, Via Barisciano, Via Campo di Giove, Via Castel Castagna, Via Civitaluparella, Via Civitaquana, Via Colledimacine, Via Corropoli, Via Gioia dei Marsi, Via Martinsicuro, Via Monteferrante, Via Monteodorisio, Via Moscufo, Via Ortucchio, Via Pennapiedimonte, Via Roccamontepiano, Via Roccascalegna, Via Tocco da Casauria, Via Tossicia, Via Turrivalignani, Via Valle Castellana;
- Towns of Lazio, e.g. Via Affile, Via Amaseno, Via Castel Madama, Via Castel San Pietro Romano, Via Jenne, Via Lenola, Via Montorio Romano, Via Morolo, Via Roccasecca;
- Towns of Molise, e.g. Via Belmonte del Sannio, Via Bonefro, Via Casalciprano, Via Castelbottaccio, Via Castelpetroso, Via Castelpizzuto, Via Castelverrino, Via Castellino del Biferno, Via Castropignano, Via Cercemaggiore, Via Cercepiccola, Via Civitacampomarano, Via Conca Casale, Via Gambatesa, Via Limosano, Via Mirabello Sannitico, Via Monteroduni, Via Pescopennataro, Via San Biase, Via Santa Croce di Magliano;
- Secretaries-general of the Comune of Rome, e.g. Via Alberto Fredda, Via Giuseppe Gagliani Caputo, Via Guglielmo Iozzia;
- Scientists and engineers, e.g. Via Adriano Buzzati-Traverso, Via Ardito Desio, Via Felice Ippolito, Via Giuseppe Gabrielli, Via Giulio Natta, Via Caterina Scarpellini;
- Writers, e.g. Piazza Dario Bellezza, Viale Attilio Bertolucci, Via Carlo Cassola, Viale Stefano D'Arrigo, Viale Goffredo Parise.

== Places of interest ==
=== Civil buildings ===
- Casale del Cavaliere, in Via del Casale del Cavaliere. Medieval farmstead. 41.930180°N 12.659983°E
- Casale di Pratolungo, in Viale della Torre di Pratolungo. Medieval farmstead. 41.943059°N 12.606802°E
- Torre di Pratolungo, in Viale della Torre di Pratolungo. Medieval tower. 41.942699°N 12.606878°E
- Ponte di Pratolungo, a medieval bridge on the Fosso di Pratolungo. 41.939590°N 12.604077°E
- Torraccia di Sant'Eusebio. 13th-century tower. 41.927381°N 12.609328°E
- Torre di Ponticello, about 1,2 km north of the junction between Via Tiburtina and Via di Settecamini. 14th-century tower. 41.949560°N 12.623388°E
- Casale di Sant'Eusebio or Casale di Campo Marzio, in Via Torre Sant'Eusebio. 13th-century farmstead and tower. 41.926701°N 12.614635°E
- Casale delle Vittorie or Casal Vecchio, in Via del Casale delle Vittorie. 16th-century farmstead. 41.964707°N 12.617930°E
- Fontanile di Sant'Onesto, between Via Forno Casale and Via Marco Simone. 16th-century fountains. 41.951027°N 12.641353°E
- Casale Forno, in Via Tiburtina, near the junction with Via di Settecamini. 17th-century farmstead. 41.938167°N 12.620817°E
- Casale Bonanni, in Via del Casale Bonanni. 20th-century farmstead. 41.939088°N 12.615017°E

=== Religious buildings ===
- Basilica di Sant'Alessandro, in Via Nomentana. The original basilica can be dated back to the 2nd century, the current structure dates back to 4th century. 41.962280°N 12.594042°E

Basilica built over the catacombs of Sant'Alessandro, in the territory of the parish of the same name.

- Chiesa di San Francesco, at the crossroad of Via Tiburtina and Via di Casal Bianco. 18th-century church. 41.938213°N 12.621379°E

Church in Late Baroque style, with simple interiors and a single nave.

- Chiesa di Santa Maria dell'Olivo, in Piazza di Santa Maria dell'Olivo. 41.939678°N 12.622793°E

Parish church erected on January 1st, 1926 according to the decree "Cum Summus Pontifex" by cardinal vicar Basilio Pompilj.

- Chiesa di Sant'Alessio, in Via Valle Castellana. 20th-century church.41.930889°N 12.646005°E

Parish church erected on March 21st, 1982 according to the decree "La situazione religiosa" by cardinal vicar Ugo Poletti.

- Chiesa di Sant'Enrico, in Viale Ratto delle Sabine.

Parish church erected on October 20th, 1989 by decree of cardinal vicar Ugo Poletti.

=== Archaeological sites ===
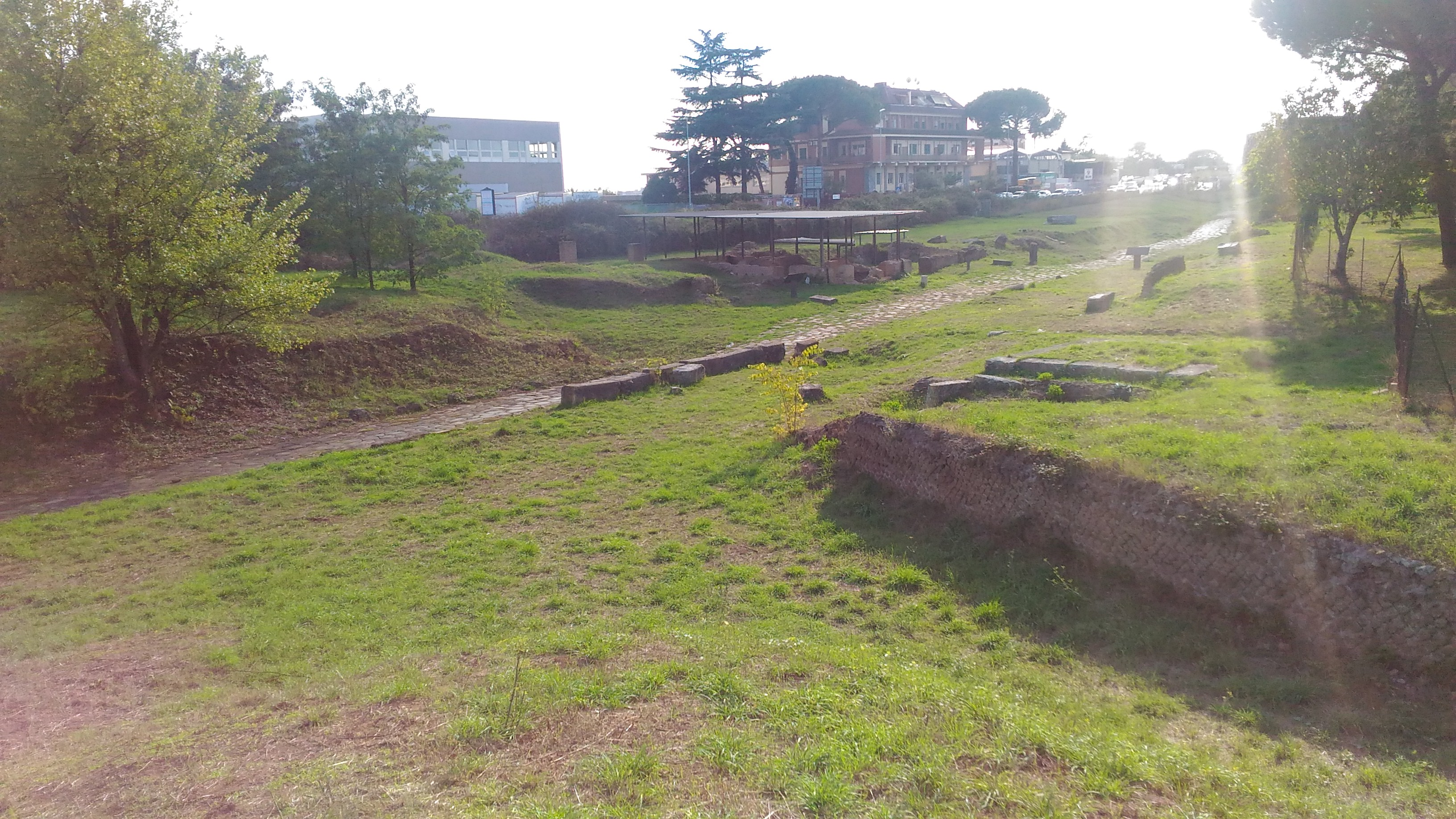
Area archeologica di Settecamini

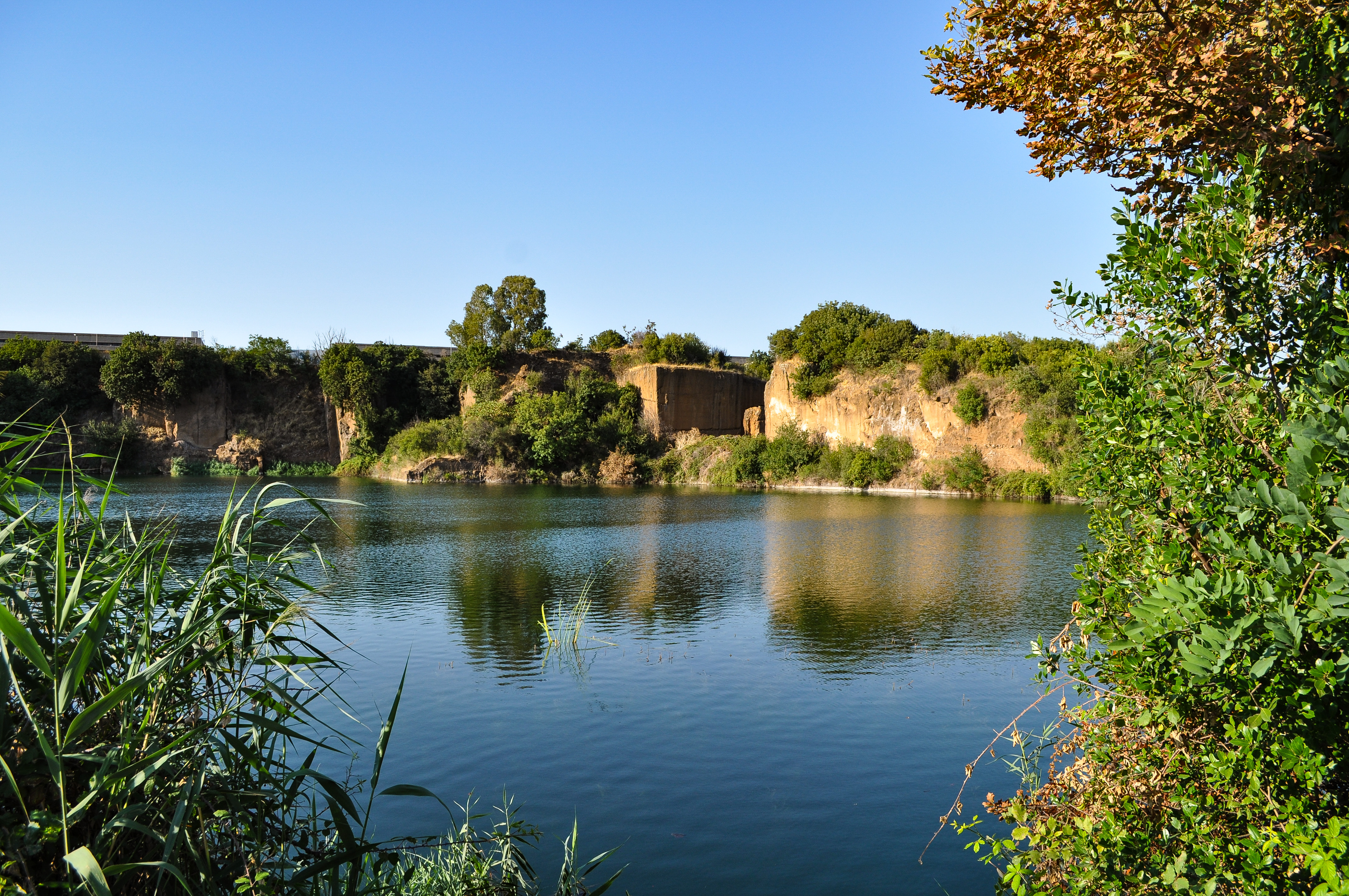
Latomie of Salone

- Settecamini archaeological area, at the junction between Via Tiburtina and Via di Casal Bianco. 1st-century building complex. 41.938302°N 12.621703°E
- Villa of Via Carciano, in Via Carciano. A 2nd-century BC villa. 41.930960°N 12.612698°E
- Villa della Torre di Sant'Eusebio, in Via Carciano. A 2nd-century BC villa. 41.930417°N 12.614409°E The villa was totally dismantled in 1991 for urban development purposes: it was located about 400 meters north of the Torre di Sant'Eusebio.
- Villa di Casal Bianco (site 2), in Via di Casal Bianco. A 2nd-century BC villa. 41.940885°N 12.626590°E The area is currently used as a recreation ground.
- Villa a Sant'Alessandro (site C), in Via Cielo D'Alcamo (9th mile of the Via Nomentana). A 2nd-century BC villa. 41.960725°N 12.597083°E
- Villa a Sant'Alessandro (site A), in Via Dante da Maiano (8th mile of the Via Nomentana). A 1st-century BC villa. 41.960885°N 12.603992°E
- Villa del Casale Bonanni, in Via del Casale Bonanni. A 1st-century BC villa. 41.943220°N 12.615768°E
- Villa di Casal Bianco, in Via di Casal Bianco (9th mile of the Via Tiburtina). A 1st-century BC villa. 41.942681°N 12.631963°E
- Thermal complex and nymphaeum, in Via Forno Casale, south of the Fosso del Fornaccio. A 1st-century BC thermal complex and a nymphaeum that dates back to 3rd or 4st century.
- Latomie of Salone and Cervara, between Via di Salone and Via delle Case Rosse. Republican age The Latomie are ancient tuff quarries located in Salone between Via Tiburtina and the Autostrada dei Parchi. The blocks of tuff were transported to Rome by raft on the Aniene river which passes a few tens of metres from the quarries. 41.924920°N 12.630596°E
- Sepulchre of Via Marcellina. Imperial age sepulchre. 41.937441°N 12.609358°E
- Sepulchres of Via Nomentana, at the junction between Via Nomentana and Via di Prato Lauro. Imperial age sepulchres. 41.968175°N 12.602689°E
- Catacombs of Sant'Alessandro, in Via Nomentana (7th mile). 2nd-century catacombs and 4th-century basilica.41.962279°N 12.594245°E
- Roman villa of Monte dello Spavento/Necropolis/Sanctuary dating to the Middle-Republican age. The necropolis is located north-west of the sanctuary.
- colombarium in tuff between via Colsereno and via Tiburtina.
- mausoleum used in the Middle Ages as a lookout tower at 98 via Casal Bianco, on ancient via Tiburtina
- The farmhouse in Casal Monastero Vecchio is built on the ruins of a Roman villa in opus vittatum in tuff and bricks on the west side, in opus caementicium in tuff and recycled material on the other sides. It is built on a brick columbarium with a terminal apse and side niches. To the south-east there are other remains also in tuff and brick, built on a previous underground structure with a vault.

== Bibliography ==
- Marina De Franceschini (2005). Ville dell'Agro romano. Rome: L'Erma di Bretschneider. ISBN 978-88-8265-311-8.
- Eschinardi, Francesco; Venuti, Ridolfino (1750). Descrizione di Roma e dell'Agro Romano. Rome: Domenico Francioli. p. 235.
