= Becchin'amor! – Che vuo', falso tradito? =

Italian sonnet

"Becchin'amor! – Che vuo', falso tradito?" is a sonnet by the Italian poet Cecco Angiolieri.

== Lyrics ==
Becchin'amor! – Che vuo', falso tradito?

– Becchin'amor! – Che vuo', falso tradito?
– Che mi perdoni. – Tu non ne se' degno.
– Merzé, per Deo! – Tu vien' molto gecchito.
– E verrò sempre. – Che sarammi pegno?

– La buona fé. – Tu ne se' mal fornito.
– No inver' di te. – Non calmar, ch'i' ne vegno.
– In che fallai? – Tu sa' ch'i' l'abbo udito.
– Dimmel', amor. – Va', che ti vegn'un segno!

– Vuo' pur ch'i' muoia? – Anzi mi par mill'anni.
– Tu non di' ben. – Tu m'insegnerai.
– Ed i' morrò. – Omè che tu m'inganni!

– Die tel perdoni. – E che, non te ne vai?
– Or potess'io! – Tègnoti per li panni?
– Tu tieni 'l cuore. – E terrò co' tuo' guai.

== Short analysis ==
The sonnet is a development of Italian medieval contrastos: it is a dialogue between the poet and the woman he loves, Becchina. She probably believes Cecco has been unfaithful, so she repulses him; in the last line the two lovers conciliate. We can easily understand the dialogue sonnet is a parody thanks to the combination of popular common sayings and courtly love's typical vocabulary.

== Bibliography ==
- Cecco Angiolieri, Rime, Fabbri editori, 1995
- Romano Luperini, Pietro Catadi, Lidia Marchiani, Franco Marchese, il nuovo La scrittura e l'interpretazione, volume 1, Palumbo editore, ISBN 978-88-8020-843-3
