= Dialogue sonnet =

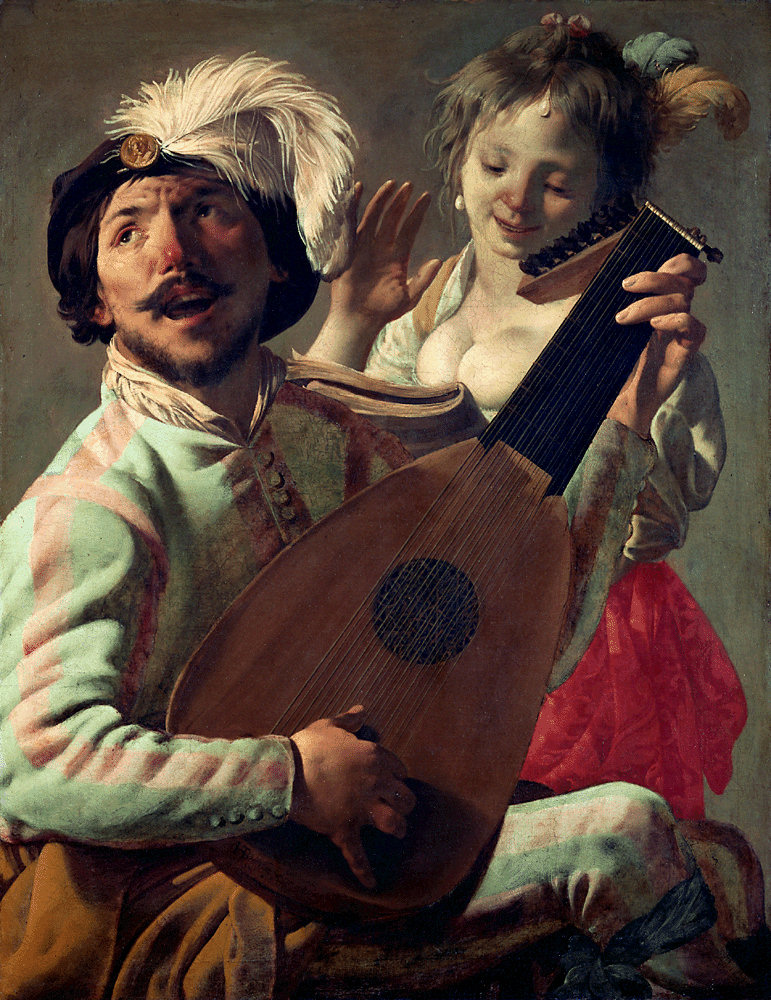
Hendrik ter Brugghen's "The Duet" (1628)

Like most of the other formal sonnet variations, dialogue sonnets first emerged in Italy. Usually they are comparatively rare, but the approach was taken up as the sonnet form spread to other literatures outside Italy and was practised then by some of the most skilful writers of their time. As the name suggests, the poem consists of a conversation between two or more participants, sometimes speaking no more than a half line each in turn, but at others answering stanza by stanza. The approach could be used for comic as well as dramatic purposes, and sometimes different registers of language distinguish the speakers.

== Theatres in miniature rooms ==
Almost from the start of the genre in the 13th century, the sonnet was cast as an address to an implied hearer, whether to a male or female companion, or internally to oneself. Sometimes the person or persons addressed might then reply in sonnets of their own, as was the case with Dante da Maiano's account of an erotic dream, in which he invited interpretation and elicited six replies. In such ways, a dialogue between sonnets might be initiated. When, however, those early authors began to answer in the voice of the person addressed within the same sonnet, a new subgenre was created, the dialogue sonnet.

In the case of Meo de' Tolomei's Per cotanto ferruzzo, Zeppa, the poet assumes the voice of two characters, his cowardly brother Zeppa and a woman who accosts him in the street and from whom he flees. There the conversation between them is broken into equal parts, couplets in the octave, tercets in the sestet. The acknowledged "master of the dialogue sonnet", especially as this was used for comic effect, was Cecco Angiolieri. The witty exchanges between the poet and his inamorata Becchina are divided within the sonnet in various ways, from the same divisions as in the already mentioned Meo de' Tolomei's to a half line back and forth throughout the whole sonnet. The speakers are further distinguished by Becchina's part being decidedly more colloquial. In another tour de force attributed to Cecco, which is set in a market, as many as eight interlocutors take part, each speaking in his own regional dialect.

The use of dialogue in sonnets was by no means limited to such burlesque contexts. Jacopo da Leona writes within the courtly conventions of the troubadour tradition, and at the same time, in his most famous composition, complains of the pains of love to a friend in a staccato conversation that divides each line into three. Dante Alighieri, in more restrained manner, uses the whole of the octave to address himself to the female mourners at the funeral of his Beatrice's father and in the sestet is answered by them in the purest Tuscan. Nevertheless, use of the vernacular continued to be associated with the Italian dialogue sonnet. In later centuries this is attested by the employment of Romanesco dialect in the Sonetti romaneschi of Giuseppe Gioachino Belli and in Neapolitan in Salvatore di Giacomo's sonnets detailing the everyday life of the poor.

As Mediaeval times gave way to the Renaissance, Italian poets continued to write dialogue sonnets, many of them being set to music that underlined their dramatic presentation. Petrarch's dialogue between the lover and his eyes, Occhi piangete, for example, was set by both Orlando di Lasso in 1555 and by Adrian Willaert in 1559; and later on, Giambattista Marino's Addio florida bella was performed in a setting by Claudio Monteverdi (1614). In his own time, Michelangelo was better known as an artist, and it was only later that his sonnets came to be appreciated. Among them was "A dialogue with love" (Dimmi di grazia, Amor, 1528) , which was translated by John Addington Symonds in 1878 in the UK and in 1900 in the US by William Wells Newell. This contains a neoplatonic discussion with Love on whether perception of beauty is objective or subjective. The lover poses this question in the octave and is answered by Love in the sestet that it is a spiritual experience. Settings of this poem were made in both Italian and Russian by Dmitri Shostakovitch, and by Anton Schoendlinger (1919-83) in Rainer Maria Rilke's German translation.

== The European Renaissance ==
By the 17th century, dialogue sonnets were being written in other European languages. The French poet Olivier de Magny (c.1529-c.1561) is credited with the first, an exchange between the love-sick author and Charon, whom he begs to transport him to the land of the dead. The poem was set to music by Orlando di Lasso and achieved great popularity. It is even suggested that Robert Herrick's dialogue song, "Charon and Phylomel", is an adaptation of the French sonnet. Some decades later, Pierre de Ronsard authored more: "Dialogue de l'autheur et du mondain" (The author and the worldling); "Le passant et la génie" (The traveller and the nature spirit), on the death of Marie (1578); and the dialogue between the poet and the turtle dove, "Que dis tu, que fais tu, pensive tourterelle". The last of these was also set by Orlando di Lasso as well as twice translated into Latin, by François de Thoor (Franciscus Thorius, 1525-1601) and by Paulus Melissus soon afterwards. A little later, Jean de La Ceppède varies the tone of love dialogue found in these works by addressing the relationship between Jesus Christ and his bride, the Church.

There were also dialogue sonnets written in the Iberian Peninsular at about this time. The first in Spanish appears in a posthumous collection of Francisco de Aldana's sonnets, where Phyllis and Damon converse after making love. A later example of burlesque dialogue is found among the commendatory verses in the prologue to Miguel de Cervantes Saavedra's Don Quixote (1605), in the form of a conversation between Babieca (the steed of El Cid), and Quijote's famished hack, Rocinante. There, as in the novel, high-flown chivalric sentiment contrasts with down-to-earth reality. In addition, the Portuguese poet Luís de Camões put several dialogue sonnets to varied use. They include elegies on the death of King John III of Portugal; on the suicide of Portia, wife of Brutus; and on the death of the unwed Infanta Maria in 1577. The last of these has question and answer succeeding each other within the same line, as happens in a later description of unhappy love, "Que esperais, esperança?"

== Dialogues in English ==
The poet and diplomat Thomas Wyatt was responsible for introducing the sonnet into English poetry, with some translated from Petrarch among them. In fact, he also adapted Petrarch's Occhi, piangete, but in doing so truncated it into a 12-line monologue. It was not until later, therefore, during the reign of Elizabeth I, that dialogue sonnets began to appear in English. Among the first of these were one in Sir Philip Sidney's Astrophel and Stella and another in William Shakespeare's Romeo and Juliet. The latter is incorporated into the action of the play and contributes to the developing courtship between the lovers. Later, Edmund Spenser reports a conversation he had with his beloved in sonnet 75 of his Amoretti sequence. A later Scottish example appears in the work of William Alexander, 1st Earl of Stirling, in which he portrays the rejection of the complaining lover by his lady.

After that flowering, no more dialogue sonnets were written in England until Victorian times, one of the first being Dante Gabriel Rossetti's poem for his drawing of "Mary Magdalene at the door of Simon the Pharisee", in which she dismisses the lover who tries to hold her back. At the same time there were other Victorian revivalists of old poetic forms, among them Edmund Gosse, whose "Alcyone" follows a Classical theme. Henry Austin Dobson's lightweight "Sonnet in dialogue" (1879) was included among his Vers de Société and, while it was deprecated in a letter to The National Review on the subject of "The degeneracy of the modern sonnet", was at the same time anthologised in Hall Caine's Humorous Poems of the Century. In fact, Dobson's light-hearted tone echoes that of a similar "dialogue-sonnet" of the era published in French by Paul Collin.

Dialogue sonnets are rarer in the United States. Jones Very's "The Removal" (1839) combines narrative with reported conversation, as does one of Robert Lowell's unrhymed sonnets from History (1969) reporting a conversation with Robert Frost. A more ambitious British undertaking in the 20th century is provided in Peter Dale's sonnet sequence One Another (1978), dealing with the changing emotions of a couple over a number of years. Though most of these sonnets converse with each other, two of them also enclose the conversation within their form: "Dialogue and Soliloquy" divides it between octave and sestet; in "Duotone" an inward commentary is divided into couplets across a Shakespearean sonnet.

== Bibliography ==
- Stefano Boselli, "Virtual Theaters in Miniature Rooms: The Early Italian Dialogic Sonnets", Italica, Vol. 88.4 (Winter 2011), pp. 499-514
- Dante Gabriel Rossetti, Poems & Translations, Everyman, 1954
