= Settecamini archaeological area =

The Settecamini archaeological area is in the Settecamini district on the eighth mile of the ancient via Tiburtina Valeria from central Rome. It was discovered in 1951. It is at the halfway point between Rome and Tivoli and crosses the road from the River Aniene to Etruria and Sabina.

The area includes the remains of several buildings of a settlement, abandoned in the 5th century, along with its monumental tombs and the ancient road surface of the via Tiburtina Valeria. The earliest building is an early Christian building inserted in a 1st-century BC pagan temple. There is a courtyard with a central well, from which lead two side entrances.

The best-preserved building is the 'taberna', probably a rest stop for travellers, which contains an Imperial-era mosaic. It seems to have been in use from the 1st century BC to the 5th century AD, as shown by its several phases, and may have fuilfilled different roles over its lifetime.
