= Tor Cervara =

- Zona of Rome
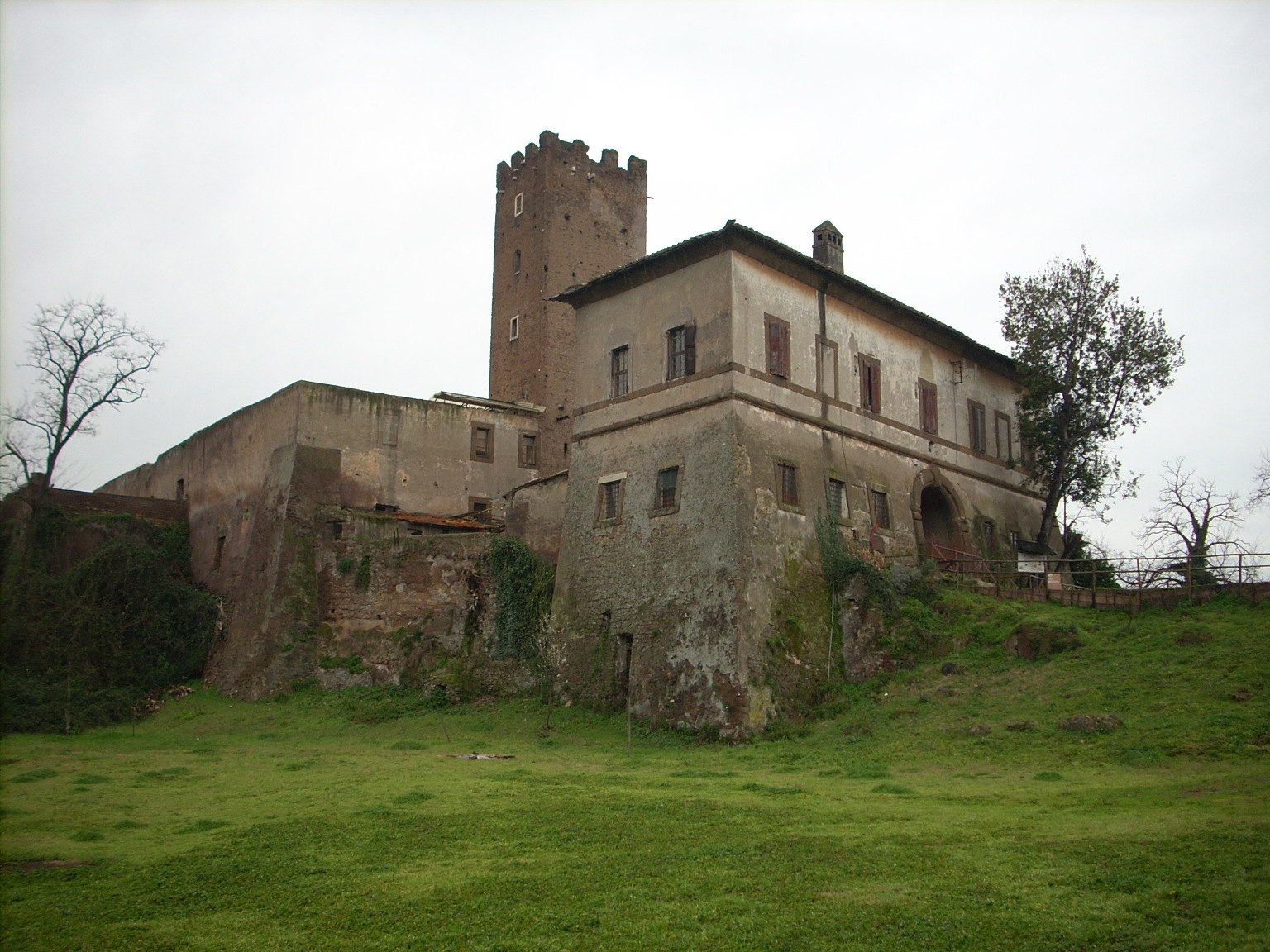
- Casale della Cervelletta

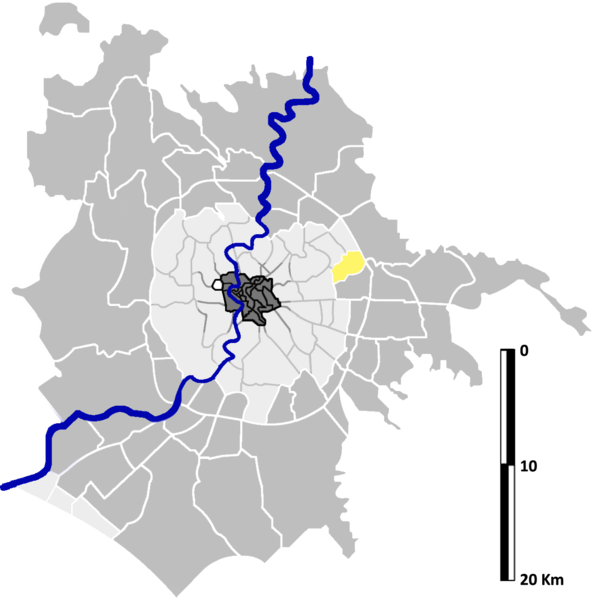
- Position of the zona within the city
- Country: Italy
- Region: Lazio
- Province: Rome
- Comune: Rome

Area
  - Total: 2.3012 sq mi (5.9600 km^{2})

Population (2016)
  - Total: 13,975
  - Density: 6,073/sq mi (2,344.8/km^{2})
- Time zone: UTC+1 (CET)
  - Summer (DST): UTC+2 (CEST)

Tor Cervara is the 7th zona of the Italian capital Rome, identified by the initials Z. VII. It belongs to the Municipio IV and has 13,975 inhabitants (2016). It is located in the east of the city, within the Grande Raccordo Anulare, and has an area of 5.9000 km^{2}.

== History ==
The name of the zone derives from an estate, the Tenuta di Cerbaro, that was used in the Middle Age as a hunting ground for deer (cervi in Latin and in Italian). The core of the estate was the Casale di Tor Cervara, that currently houses a private hospital.

== Geography ==
The territory of Tor Cervara includes the urban zone 5F Tor Cervara and the eastern part of the urban zone 5D Tiburtino Sud (namely, the area called Colli Aniene).

=== Boundaries ===
Northward, Tor Cervara borders with Quartiere Ponte Mammolo (Q. XXIX), from which is separated by the stretch of the river Aniene between Via Tiburtina and Via di Tor Cervara, and by Via di Tor Cervara itself; and also borders with Quartiere San Basilio (Q. XXX), whose border is marked by the stretch of Via Tiburtina between Via di Tor Cervara and the GRA.

Eastward, Tor Cervara borders with Zona Settecamini (Z. VI), whose border is marked by the stretch of the GRA between Via Tiburtina and the river Aniene. To the east, Tor Cervara also shares a short border with Zona Acqua Vergine (Z. IX), which is outlined by the stretch of the GRA between the river Aniene and the A24.

Southward, the zone borders with Zona Tor Sapienza (Z. VIII), from which is separated by the stretch of the A24 between the GRA and Viale Palmiro Togliatti.

Westward, Tor Cervara borders with Quartiere Collatino (Q. XXII), from which is separated by the stretch of Viale Palmiro Togliatti between the A24 and Via Tiburtina.

=== Odonymy ===
Odonyms of the zone mainly refer to Italian politicians (in the area of Colli Aniene), artists and characters of Virgil's poems. In the northern part of the zone, near the border with Quartiere San Basilio, a few streets are named after towns of Lazio and local industrialists. Odonyms of the zone can be categorized as follows:

- Artists, e.g. Via Matteo Civitali, Via Giacomo del Duca, Via Jacopo della Quercia, Via Mario Schifano, Via Renzo Vespignani, Via Alberto Ziveri;
- Industrialists, e.g. Via Giulio Vincenzo Bona, Via dei Luxardo, Via Donato Passaquindici, Via Carlo Pesenti;
- Local toponyms, e.g. Via del Casale Caletto, Via di Cervara, Piazza and Via della Cervelletta, Via dei Laghi Sportivi, Via di Tor Cervara, Via di Vannina;
- Politicians, e.g. Via Giorgio Amendola, Via Angelica Balabanoff, Viale Battista Bardanzellu, Via Francesco Compagna, Viale Ettore Franceschetti, Via Fausto Gullo, Piazza Camillo Loriedo, Via Meuccio Ruini, Via Amedeo Sommovigo, Via Giuseppe Spataro, Viale Palmiro Togliatti, Largo Ezio Vanoni;
- Towns of Lazio, e.g. Via Cineto Romano, Via Gerano, Via Licenza, Via Roccagiovine, Via Tivoli;
- Virgilian characters and poems, e.g. Via Alete, Via Antenore, Largo Cassandra, Via Cloanto, Via Creusa, Via Dafni, Via Dameta, Largo Didone, Via dell'Eneide, Via delle Georgiche, Via Lauso, Via Melibeo.

== Places of interest ==
=== Civil buildings ===
- Casale di Tor Cervara, in Via di Tor Cervara. A 17th-century farmstead with a 13th-century tower. 41.923803°N 12.587630°E

Currently used as a private hospital, named Castello della Quiete.

- Casale della Cervelletta, in Via della Cervelletta. A 17th-century farmstead with a 13th-century tower.
- Casale Di Cosimo, in Via di Tor Cervara. 20th-century farmstead, built during the reclamation of the area. 41.919838°N 12.588018°E

=== Religious buildings ===
- Chiesa di Santa Maria Immacolata alla Cervelletta, in Piazza della Cervelletta. A 20th-century church (1911). 41.912464°N 12.587801°E
- Cappella di San Michele, in Via del Casale Cavallari. A 20th-century chapel. 41.931668°N 12.595464°E

Subsidiary place of worship of the parish church of Santa Maria dell'Olivo.

- Chiesa di Santa Bernadetta Soubirous, in Viale Ettore Franceschini. A 20th-century church (1985). 41.913109°N 12.576362°E

Project by architect Vivina Rizzi. Parish church erected on 5 November 1975 according to the decree Neminem latet by cardinal vicar Ugo Poletti and dedicated to Bernadette Soubirous.

=== Archaeological sites ===
- Red tufa quarries, near the river Aniene, dating back to the Republican Age.
- Villa of Via Antenore, in Via Antenore. A Roman villa dating back to the Republican Age.
- Villa del Fosso di Tor Sapienza, near the Fosso di Tor Sapienza. A Roman villa dating back to the Republican Age.
- Tor Cervara Necropolis, in Via di Tor Cervara. 2nd-century necropolis.

Several ancient tombs have been found in the necropolis, especially thirteen ground burials, a rectangular hypogeum and a circular hypogeum: the latter contains five recesses with six marble sarcophagi.

=== Natural areas ===
- Riserva naturale Valle dell'Aniene, along the river Aniene. 41.918385°N 12.585157°E
- Parco Nuovo Auspicio, in Via degli Alberini. 41.919614°N 12.575820°E
