= Erminia Fuà Fusinato =

Italian poet (1834–1876)

Erminia Fuà Fusinato (23 October 1834 in Rome – 30 September 1876 in Rome) was an Italian poet and educator, best remembered for her verses based on the Ars Poetica method. Born to a Jewish family, she established herself as an important poet in the Kingdom of Lombardy–Venetia, and is widely remembered as one of the most influential poets of Italian literature of the 19th century.
