= Roberto Carifi =

Italian poet and philosopher

- Born: 1948 (age 77–78); Pistoia, Tuscany, Italy
- Known for: Poetry, Philosophy
- Movement: Hermeticism

Roberto Carifi (born 1948 in Pistoia), is an Italian poet, philosopher, and translator, supported since the beginning from Piero Bigongiari, one of the major exponents of Florentine Hermeticism. He is considered important poet and intellectual of his generation.

== Biography ==
Since his university years, Carifi was attracted by French and German philosophy; in his mature age he also crossed paths with Buddhist, getting influenced, for instance, in his collections such as Tibet and The Secret. Alongside philosophical studies, there are those of psychoanalysis, first carried out at L'École Freudienne in Paris, as an auditor at the lectures held by Jacques Lacan, and continued in Milan. Carifi poetic has been deeply influenced by the lyrical voices of Rainer Maria Rilke and Georg Trakl, on which he also practiced as a translator. In addition of being a poet, he worked as a literary critic. In 2004, he got a stroke which affected and slow down his creativity.

== Works ==
=== Poetry collections ===
- Infanzia (Società di Poesia, Milan 1984 - rist. Raffaelli, Rimini 2012);
- L’obbedienza (Crocetti, Milan 1986);
- Occidente (Crocetti, Milan 1990);
- Amore e destino (Crocetti, Milan 1993);
- Poesie (I Quaderni del Battello Ebbro, Porretta Terme 1993);
- Casa nell’ombra (Almanacco Mondadori, Milan 1993);
- Il Figlio (Jaca Book, Milan 1985);
- Il male e la luce (I Quaderni del Battello Ebbro, 1997);
- Amore d’autunno (Guanda, Parma-Milan 1998);
- Europa (Jaca Book, Milan 1999).
- Il gelo e la luce (Le Lettere, Firenze 2003);
- La pietà e la memoria (Edizioni ETS, Pisa 2003) ISBN 88-467-0782-6;
- D'improvviso e altre poesie scelte (Via del Vento edizioni 2006);
- Nel ferro dei balocchi (Crocetti, Milano 2008);
- Tibet (Le Lettere, Firenze 2011);
- Madre (Le Lettere, Firenze 2014);
- Il Segreto (Le Lettere, Firenze 2015);
- Amorosa sempre. Poesie (1980-2018) (La Nave di Teseo, 2018);
- Ablativo assoluto (AnimaMundi Edizioni, 2024);

=== Essays ===
- Il gesto di Callicle (Società di Poesia, Milano 1982);
- Il segreto e il dono (EGEA, Milano 1994);
- Le parole del pensiero (Le Lettere, Firenze 1995);
- Il male e la luce (I Quaderni del Battello Ebbro, Porretta Terme 1997);
- L’essere e l’abbandono (Il Ramo d’Oro, Firenze 1997);
- Nomi del Novecento (Le Lettere, Firenze 2000);
- Nome di donna (Raffaelli, Rimini 2010).

== Bibliography ==
- M. Baudino, Nel mitico mondo di Carifi, "Gazzetta del Popolo", 19 settembre 1979;
- C. Viviani, Il mito e il nuovo inquilino, "Il Giorno", 7 ottobre 1979;
- F. Ermini, Il mito per relazionarsi al reale, "Il quotidiano dei lavoratori", 13 marzo 1982;
- G. Giudici, Il gesto di Callicle, "L’Espresso", n. 40-41, ottobre 1982;
- A. Porta, Il gesto di Callicle, "Alfabeta", n. 41, ottobre 1982;
- M. Spinella, La microfisica del significante poetico, "Rinascita", n. 32, 1982;
- G. Raboni, Qui sento odor di buoni versi, "Il Messaggero", 20 giugno 1984;
- T. Kemeny, Infanzia, "Il piccolo Hans", n. 46, 1985;
- M. Baudino, Al fuoco di un altro amore, Jaca Book, 1986;
- F. Masini, L’anima e la forma nei versi di Carifi, "Avvenire", 1° novembre 1986;
- P.F.Iacuzzi, Il paradosso della poesia italiana degli anni ottanta, "Paradigma", n. 7, 1986;
- B. Frabotta, Utopisti e menestrelli, "L’indice", n. 7, luglio 1987;
- R. Mussapi, Nostalgia del tragico, "Corriere del Ticino", 14 novembre 1987;
- I Quaderni del Battello Ebbro, n. 5, aprile 1990 (con saggi di V. Giuliani, P.F. Iacuzzi, F. Sessi, L. Tassoni, I. Vincentini);
- T. Di Francesco, Basso continuo del rumore bellico per litanie epiche sull’occidente, "Il Manifesto", 9 novembre 1990;
- M. Cucchi, Il filo del tramonto e del rimpianto, "Il Giornale", 9 dicembre 1990;
- P. Bigongiari, La poesia, il luogo del ritorno a casa, "La Nazione", 29 marzo 1991;
- A. Mazzarella, La lingua continua a battere dove la carità duole, "Il Mattino", 1° maggio 1991;
- F. Loi, Il buio mondo che ci avvolge, "Il Sole 24 ore", 10 marzo 1991;
- F. Rella, Il lato oscuro delle cose, "La Repubblica", 16 marzo 1991;
- E. Gatta, Sul vuoto appesi alla parola, "La Nazione", 11 febbraio 1992;
- S. Crespi, Amore senza tempo, "Il Sole 24 ore", 3 ottobre 1993;
- R. Copioli, E per musa ispiratrice la nostalgia, "Avvenire", 16 dicembre 1993;
- L. Carra, Classici pensosi versi, "Gazzetta di Parma", 31 dicembre 1993;
- A. Donati, Amore per una donna e per il nulla, "Il Giorno", 24 ottobre 1993;
- E. Gatta, Gli amori di Carifi, "La Nazione", 10 novembre 1993;
- B. Manetti, Carifi il poeta errante, "La Repubblica", 8 novembre 1993;
- D. Attanasio, Amore e morte trascendenti segreti, "Il Manifesto", 9 giugno 1994;
- R. Copioli, Carifi: il desiderio è mitico, "Avvenire", 14 maggio 1994;
- E. Grasso, L’amore quando il lume si spegne, "L’Unità", 24 gennaio 1994;
- A. Donati, Intervista a Roberto Carifi, "Il Giorno", 24 aprile 1994;
- S. Crespi, Doni al confine del tempo, "Il Sole 24 ore", maggio 1994;
- A. Donati, L’angelo poetico della solitudine, "Il Giorno", 26 gennaio 1994;
- R. Copioli, Figli innamorati del proprio destino, "Avvenire", 28 ottobre 1995;
- M. Liberatore, Il male, una provocazione estetica nei racconti di Roberto Carifi, "La Clessidra", n. 1, 1995;
- S. Crespi, Chiaroscuro con lampada e scialle, "Il Sole 24 ore", 15 ottobre 1995;
- G. Conte, Chi son? Sono un poeta, "Il Giornale", 16 ottobre 1995;
- A. Ugolotti, Il dolore nelle sillabe, "La Gazzetta di Parma", 10 gennaio 1996;
- A. Donati, Roberto Carifi: un angelo in esilio, "Avvenimenti", 28 agosto 1996;
- U. Piersanti, Il figlio, "Tutto Libri", 25 novembre 1996;
- P. Bigongiari, Carifi: parole e voce di Figlio, "La Nazione", 5 gennaio 1996;
- A. Torno, Quel contratto da verificare, "Il Sole 24 ore", 6 aprile 1997;
- R. Copioli, Carifi: angeli sospesi tra essere e abbandono, "Avvenire", 12 dicembre 1997;
- G. Tesio, Un neoromantico invoca il cuore, i sogni, l’addio, "Tutto Libri", 19 novembre 1998;
- M. Fortunato, Amore d’autunno, "L’Espresso", n. 43, 29 ottobre 1998;
- P.F. Iacuzzi, Morte di madre. Quando la poesia "riversa la vita", "Il Giornale", 5 ottobre 1998;
- R. Copioli, Carifi e l’elegia di uno stile semplice", "Avvenire", 24 ottobre 1998;
- U. Cecchi, Quei legami vitali tra figlio e madre, "La Nazione", 6 ottobre 1998;
- S. Crespi, Carifi: tra infelicità e silenzio, "Il Sole 24 ore", 27 settembre 1998;
- S. Ramat, Un dolcissimo amore d’autunno, "Il Giornale", 18 settembre 1998;
- D. Fiesoli, Carifi e l’estetica dell’amore, "Il Tirreno", 18 ottobre 1998;
- E. Zucchi, Dalla parte del cuore, "Gazzetta di Parma", 19 novembre 1998;
- E. Coco, Roberto Carifi, Rivista de Literatura del centro cultural, n. 3, Malaga, junio 1998;
- F. Desideri, Un dialogo a distanza sull’alterità del figlio, introduzione a R. Carifi e U. Buscioni, Figure dell’abbandono, maschiettoemusolino, Siena 1998;
- M. Merlin, Il pathos del sublime: la poesia di Carifi, "Atelier", n. 15, settembre 1999;
- D. Fiesoli, Europa, "Il Tirreno", 15 dicembre 1999;
- B. Garavelli, Addio alla madre, "Avvenire", 8 gennaio 2000;
- G. Colotti, Europa, "Il Manifesto", 8 gennaio 2000;
- R. Bartoli, La religiosa tragicità di Carifi, "Poesia", n. 137, marzo 2000.
- S. Ramat, Roberto Carifi nel nome della madre, "Il Giornale", 01 settembre 2007;
