= Catacomb of Sant'Alessandro =

Catacombs on the Via Nomentana in Rome, Italy

Coordinates: 41°57′44″N 12°35′39″E

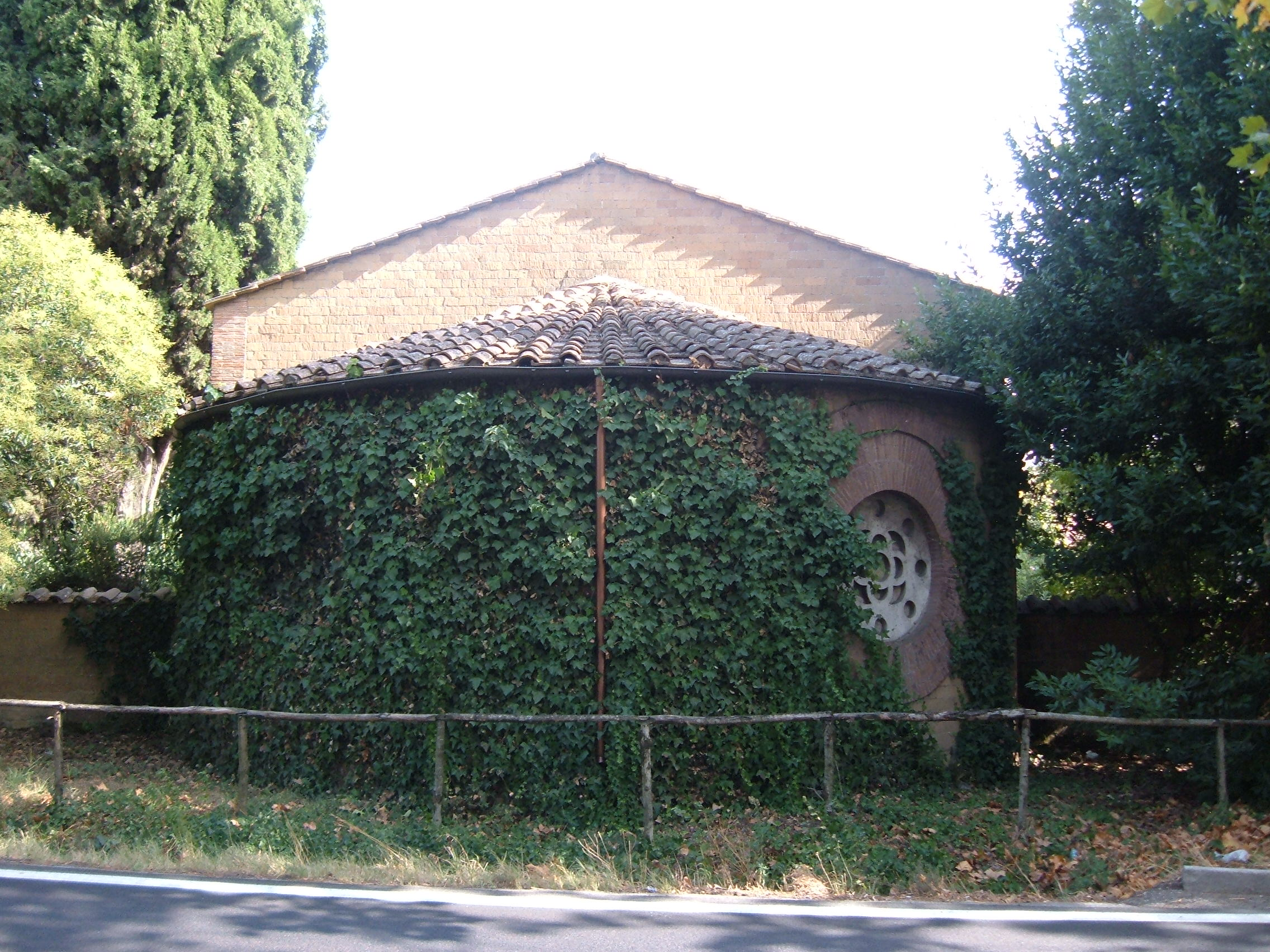
Apse of the reconstructed basilica of Sant'Alessandro on via Nomentana.

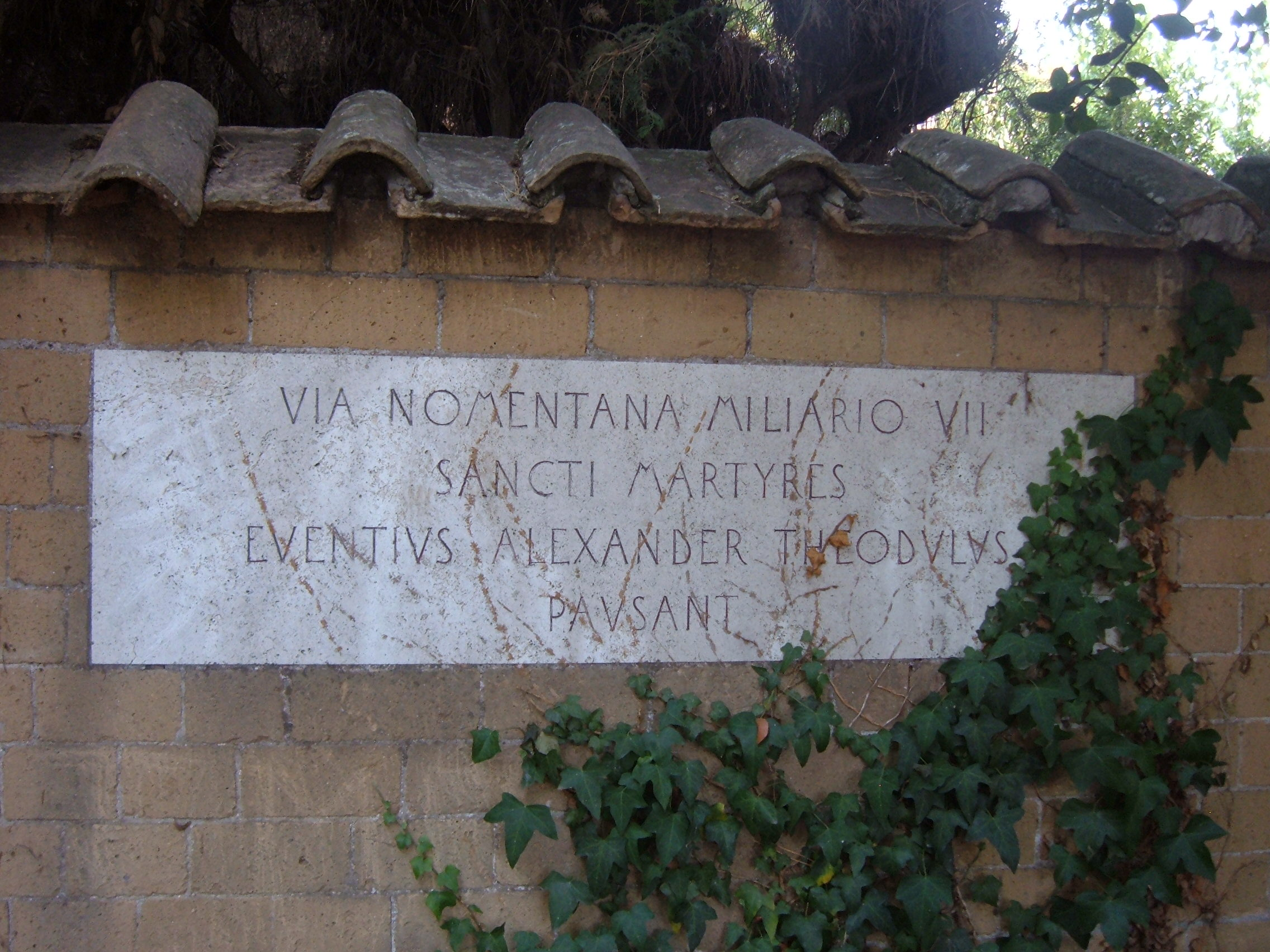
Stone at the entrance to the catacomb area.

The basilica and Catacombs of Sant' Alessandro is a single-level catacomb, located in the Sant'Alessandro area of Municipio IV on the outskirts of Rome. It was first built in the 7th century on the via Nomentana. It is dedicated to the martyr Alexander, as is known from an inscription inside the complex mentioning him alongside his companions Eventius and Theodolus - all three were probably martyred during the Diocletianic Persecution or in AD 116 under Trajan.

The basilica was built at the start of the 5th century on the site of an earlier small sanctuary by Ursus, Bishop of Nomentum, under pope Innocent I. The basilica also has an entrance hall, two rooms for the tombs of the three martyrs, and several funerary structures. Both catacombs and basilica were badly damaged in the Gothic War.
