= Gianni Ianuale =

Italian poet and literary critic

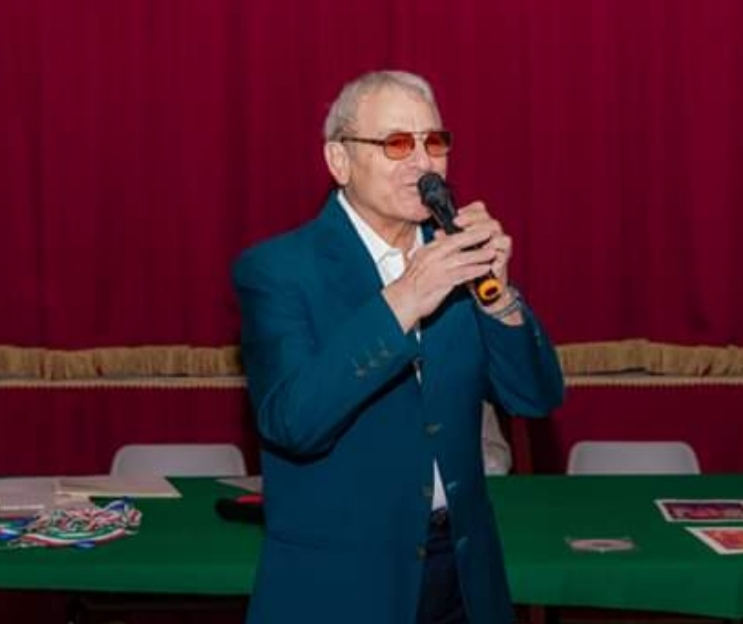
- Born: 28 March 1946 (age 80); Castello di Cisterna, Italy
- Occupation: Poet
- Writing career
- Notable awards: First place Premio Internazionale “Rosario Angelo Livatino” di Brolo 2019

Gianni Ianuale (28 March 1946) is an Italian poet and literary critic. He lives and works in Naples.

== Life and career ==
Born in Castello di Cisterna near Naples, Italian poet and literary critic active in both activities with the organization of prizes and poetic presentations. Gianni Ianuale was a pupil of the Jesuit Angelo Arpa spiritual adviser of Federico Fellini. He is also the author of song lyrics.

In 2002 Gianni Ianuale established the Academy Internazionale Vesuviana. In 2009 he organized the Premio Lettere ed arti “Due Sicilie” in Palermo. The poet is a member of leading Italian literary awards as: Premio Juan Montalvo, Premio Letterario Castrum Cisternae

== Published works ==
- Ianuale, Gianni (1995). Viaggio nell'amore (in Italian). Edizioni Nuove Proposte U.A.O.C.
- Ianuale, Gianni (1994). L'ultimo canto (in Italian). Cultura Duemila.
- Ianuale, Gianni (1997). Lasciatemi cantare l'infinito (in Italian). Edizioni Nuove Proposte U.A.O.C.
- Ianuale, Gianni (1998). Sinfonia di un amore (in Italian). Edizioni Grafica Anselmi.
- Ianuale, Gianni (1998). Nella note degli angeli (in Italian). Edizioni Grafica Anselmi.
- Ianuale, Gianni (1998). Cadenze elegiache (in Italian). Edizioni Grafica Anselmi.
- Ianuale, Gianni (2000). L'altra anima del cielo (in Italian). ISBN 978-88-8264-159-7.
- Ianuale, Gianni (2002). Nella magia di Schonbrunh (in Italian). LER Edizioni. ISBN 88-8264-202-X.
- Ianuale, Gianni (2003). Un'anima azzurra (in Italian). LER Editrice. ISBN 88-8264-291-7.
- Ianuale, Gianni (2004). Il mistero delle parole (in Italian). LER Editrice. ISBN 978-88-8264-336-2.
- Ianuale, Gianni (2005). Conchiglie di Luna (in Italian). LER Editrice. ISBN 88-8264-358-1.
- Ianuale, Gianni; Zangara, Piera (2005). Santi lumi del cielo. Etica e letteratura (in Italian). ISBN 978-88-8264-373-7.
- Ianuale, Gianni (2006). Lasciatemi cantare l'infinito (in Italian). LER Edizioni.
- Ianuale, Gianni (2007). Il cigno di Athena (in Italian). Gabrieli International Editor.
- Ianuale, Gianni; Russo, Vincenzo (2008). Parole senza tempo (in Italian). LER editrice.
- Ianuale, Gianni (2009). Sintagmi poetici (in Italian). LER Editrice. ISBN 978-88-8264-474-1.
- Ianuale, Gianni (2009). Tra sensi e dissensi (in Italian). LER Editrice.
- Ianuale, Gianni (2009). Gli Angeli… Una pioggia di stelle (in Italian). LER Editrice.
- Ianuale, Gianni; Russo, Vincenzo (2010). Aneliti di libertà (in Italian). Rav. In. Progress Editrice.
- Ianuale, Gianni; Russo, Vincenzo (2010). Come cristalli d'acqua (in Italian). Rav. In. Progress Editrice.
- Ianuale, Gianni; Russo, Vincenzo (2011). Parole senza tempo (in Italian). LER editrice.
- Ianuale, Gianni (2014). Nei luoghi dell'infinito (in Italian). Brignoli Edizioni. ISBN 978-88-9831-708-0.
- Ianuale, Gianni (2015). Canto... Quando il mondo dorme (in Italian). Brignoli Edizioni. ISBN 978-88-98317-24-0.
- Ianuale, Gianni (2016). Pathos trascendentale (in Italian). Brignoli Edizioni. ISBN 978-88-9831-737-0.
- Ianuale, Gianni (2017). Lampi degli dei (in Italian). Brignoli Edizioni. ISBN 9788898317691.
- Ianuale, Gianni (2019). Nella Terra degli Angeli (in Italian). Irirs edizioni. ISBN 978-88-99640-09-5.
- Giudice Crisafi, Silvio; Ianuale, Gianni (2019). Nobili Sentieri (in Italian). Iris edizioni. ISBN 978-88-99640-04-0.
- Ianuale, Gianni (2003). Pensieri sotto la Luna (in Italian). LER Editrice. ISBN 978-88-8264-247-1.
