= Jacopo da Leona =

Italian medieval jurist and poet

Jacopo da Leona (né Jacopo del Tancredo; forename also spelt Iacopo) was an Italian medieval jurist and poet who died in 1277. A notary by profession, he became a nobleman's secretary and later a judge. Sixty of his sonnets survive.

== Life and work ==
Beginning life as Jacopo del Tancredo in the village of Levane, Arezzo, Leona took his later surname from the Castle of Leona (Castello di Leona), on which his village depended. Here he learnt the work of a notary, under the patronage of the family of Ubertini of Arezzo, and one of the Ubertini, Ranieri, employed him as a secretary. Leona went with his master to Volterra, and in 1273, when Ranieri was elected as a bishop, Leona was appointed as a judge.

Of Leona's poetry, a songbook of sixty sonnets survives, of which the Vatican Library's manuscript Codex 3793 (Canzoniere Vaticano latino 3793) contains seven. All of the sonnets belong to the years before 1277. They divide broadly into satire and love poetry, which is original but mannered, adopting the style and themes of courtly love. Leona's best known work, which takes the form of a dialogue sonnet, has the title "Lady, I lament me of you" (Madonna, di voi piango e mi lamento).

On Leona's death, Guittone d'Arezzo addressed an ode to him which calls him Giacomo da Leona and refers to him as a friar.
