= Caterina Franceschi Ferrucci =

Italian writer and educator

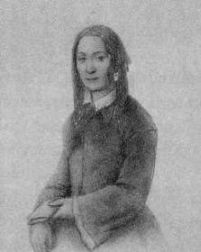
Caterina Franceschi Ferrucci

Caterina Franceschi Ferrucci (Narni, 26 January 1803 – Florence, 28 February 1887) was an Italian writer, poet, patriot, and educator.

== Biography ==
Caterina Franceschi was the daughter of Antonio Franceschi and the Countess Maria Spada di Cesi. Her father, a doctor and politician, was the minister of the Roman Republic (18th Century) in 1798. In 1808, the year in which Napoleon decreed the annexation of Marche to the Kingdom of Italy, her father was named as the municipal doctor for Osimo. That same year, through an accident, Franceschi lost sight in one eye. She had a humanistic education, guided by the priest Francesco Fuina, and acquired a proficiency in Latin, Latin literature, and Italian classics. She distinguished herself for her knowledge and work to spread it with a marked patriotic imprint to be praised by politicians like Camillo Benso, Count of Cavour, intellectuals like Vincenzo Gioberti, and scholars such as Alessandro Manzoni.

In 1823, her family moved to Macerata, and Franceschi began her study of Greek. In 1824 she wrote Intorno alla più degna gloria dello scrivere, banned by papal censureship. In 1826, she wrote Sull'imitazione dei classici, taking the position, in the literary debate between the Romantics and the Classicists, in favor of the latter. Classical culture, she wrote, does not only have an intrinsic aesthetic value, but also a formative and political one, being able to constitute the inspiring principal of a renewal of Italy that brings it back to its ancient greatness.

Her activities did not pass unobserved: Giacomo Leopardi read and praised her translation of De amicitia by Cicero and in 1826, wrote about her to Francesco Puccinotti, hoping that she could become a protagonist in the literary and social

== Early work and teaching career ==
Change movement, both with poetry and "the prose and philosophy […] as the most famous women from other nations have done and do" in order to be "a true honor of Italy". Indeed, Franceschi cultivated her study of philosophy under the tutelage of Paolo Costa, who sought to match the sensualism of Étienne Bonnot de Condillac with the needs of religious spiritualism.

On September 2, 1827, Franceschi married the Latinist Michele Ferrucci in Macerata, a former high school teacher who, from that same year, worked as a professor of rhetoric and Latin and Italian poetics at the University of Bologna, the city where Franceschi moved. She assimilated herself into the intellectual environment and they met Pietro Giordani: in 1828, at the Academy of Felsinei, who read her Inno alla Morte and then Inno alla Provvidenza. In 1829 her son Antonio was born, followed by her daughter Rosa in 1835.

Along with her husband, Franceschi supported the revolutionary movement of 1831: their participation was limited to several writings, in one of which the Catholic Michele called the papal control “acerbissima tirannide”. In April, when temporary power was reestablished in Bologna, Michele was initially dismissed from teaching and then readmitted after a retraction. Regarded with suspicion and denied any possibility of career advancement, in 1836 the family decided to move to Geneva, where Michele was hired as a teacher of Latin literature at the University thanks to the recommendations of Camillo Cavour and the Latinist Carlo Boucheron.

In Geneva, Franceschi taught a course on Italian literature in French from 1838; initiated with the lesson L'état actuel de la poésie en Italie (The Actual State of Poetry in Italy). She spoke on the theme of the juxtaposition between the Romantics and Classicists with a more balanced viewpoint than in the past, by criticizing the tired imitation of the ancients in modern Classicism and comparing it with an appreciation for the newness introduced by Romantic literature; that is, historical themes and Christian inspiration. However, a nostalgia for Italy remained: after having searched in vain for an accommodation with the papal authorities, Michele succeeded in gaining a teaching position in history and archeology at the University of Pisa in October 1843, and from 1845, that of classic literature. The hope to return, also generated in the family by the election of Pope Pius IX, urged him to participate in the pro-Papal demonstrations organized in Livorno in 1847 by Giuseppe Montanelli and to enroll himself, along with his son Antonio, in the battalion of Tuscan students that victoriously fought in Curtatone on May 29, 1848.

Franceschi sent the eulogistic compositions Esaltazione al pontificato and Amnistia to the new pope, she published political articles in the Bolognese newspaper Il Felsineo, and also published the booklet Della repubblica in Italia: considerazioni out of Milan in 1848. She sent letters to Marco Minghetti and, naturally, to her husband and son, in which Franceschi shows a notable liberal and patriotic spirit, and encourages her family to fully carry out their duty as combatants. With the Austrian restoration, followed by the defeat of the liberal movement, the moderate Michele adapted to the new climate; thereby saving his own university position from the purges ordered among the Democratic professors by Leopold II, Grand Duke of Tuscany, and also obtaining the position in Italian literature.

In 1847, Franceschi had published the volume Della educazione morale della donna Italiana in Turin, in which she addresses the topic of women's education. Based on the ideas of Vincenzo Gioberti, she affirms that mothers should be the ones to assume the responsibility of their children's education instead of the clerical schools. Therefore, it is these same women who need to be educated in order to carry out such a delicate and demanding task. The founding principles of education consist of the development of the idea of the good, the true, and the beautiful in the minds of young people, such that it will produce a profound civic and spiritual transformation in generations of Italians.

In her view, assigning a determinant role in the education of children to the women does not equate to recognizing, even implicitly, a social and civil equality between the sexes. “Gli uomini s'ebbero in particolar distintivo la forza dell'intelletto e la gagliardia delle membra: noi avemmo dalla natura a dote speciale la soavità degli affetti e la tenerezza del cuore”, ed è “stoltissima l'opinione di quelli, i quali vorrebbero che le donne avessero in comune cogli uomini gli uffici, e gli onori: sicché in luogo di attendere ai casalinghi lavori, e ad allevare i loro figlioli perdessero in gare ambiziose la pace dell'animo, la verecondia, e la dignità della vita.” “Men have always had as their defining characteristics, force of intellect and physical strength: we on the other hand have the special gift of softness of affections and tenderness of the heart”, and it is very wrong, the opinions of those who would want women to have in common with men professions and honors: because, by expecting housewives to work, and to raise their children, they would lose their peace of the soul, chastity, and dignity of life in ambitious competition.

== Political writings ==
The hostility she showed in the confrontations with the brief experience of the democratic government instituted in Tuscany in 1849 is testimony to her political and social moderatism. In 1850 she moved from Pisa to Florence, where she received the invitation to direct the new “Istituto italiano di educazione femminile” in Genova that was inaugurated on November 15, and for which Franceschi had published the teaching program. Firstly, she planned for instruction in religion and of Catholic morals, then of literature and the Italian language, history and geography, mathematics and the sciences, and of activities suitable for the development of the female spirit: domestic work, and artistic disciplines that would give elegance to the person such as gymnastics, drawing and painting, singing and dancing, music, and education in the pianoforte and harp.

That experience was brief: her program was critically evaluated from opposing clerical and laical positions, and Franceschi's irregular presence at the Institute caused her to be dismissed in September 1851. Franceschi dedicated herself to the education of young Italian women in Educazione intellettuale, who needed to be educated in the rejection of any form of materialism and the teaching of spiritualism; meanwhile, for Letture morali ad uso delle fanciulle, she published Degli studi delle donne italiane in 1854. She moved once again to Pisa, and completed two volumes of I primi quattro secoli della letteratura italiana dal secolo XIII al XVI in 1858; according to Franceschi, an example of how Italians know better in earlier centuries how to create beauty, and a model of inspiration for her contemporaries.

In 1857 her daughter Rosa died, at little more than twenty years old. Franceschi published several writings and a brief remembrance, followed by a long silence. On July 13, 1871, she was elected to the Accademia della Crusca as the first corresponding woman member; for such an occasion she wrote Della necessità di conservare alla nostra lingua e alla nostra letteratura l'indole schiettamente Italiana. In November 1875 she had a stroke. The paralysis and prolonged period of mourning following the death of her daughter and then her husband in 1881, isolated her completely: she went to live in Florence in the home of her nephew Filippo, where she died February 28, 1887. She was buried at a private chapel; her gravestone remembers her as “Donna per ingegno e virtù rara in ogni tempo / quasi unica nel nostro”.

== Works ==
- Intorno alla più degna gloria dello scrivere, 1824
- Sull'imitazione dei classici, 1826
- Inno alla Morte, 1828
- Inno alla Provvidenza, 1828
- Della educazione morale della donna italiana, Torino, Pomba, 1847
- Letture morali ad uso delle fanciulle, Genova, Tip. De' Sordo-Muti, 1851
- Della educazione intellettuale: libri quattro indirizzati alle madri italiane, Torino, Pomba, 1849-1851
- Degli studii delle donne, Torino, Pomba, 1853
- I primi quattro secoli della Letteratura Italiana, dal secolo XIII al XVI. Lezioni, Firenze, 1856-1858.
- Rosa Ferrucci e alcuni suoi scritti pubblicati per cura di sua madre, Firenze, Barbera, 1857.
- Prose e versi, Firenze, Le Monnier, 1873
- Degli studi delle donne italiane, Firenze, Successori Le Monnier, 1876
- Ai giovani italiani. Ammaestramenti religiosi e morali, Firenze, Le Monnier, 1877
- Una buona madre. Letture morali per le giovanette, Firenze, Successori Le Monnier, 1884
- Sei lettere di Caterina Franceschi al fidanzato Michele Ferrucci. Per nozze Paolo Ferrucci e Teresa Tabarrini, Rimini, Tip. Malvolti e C., 1887
- Ida Eugenia Ciancarelli, Una donna italiana nel 1848. Lettere inedite di Caterina Franceschi Ferrucci, Rieti, Tip. Trinchi, 1907
- Epistolario di Caterina Franceschi Ferrucci edito ora la prima volta, con lettere di scrittori illustri a lei per cura di Giuseppe Guidetti, Reggio D'Emilia, Tip. U. Guidetti, 1910.
- Lettere inedite di Caterina Franceschi Ferrucci, a cura di Achille De Rubertis, Firenze, Galletti e Cocci, 1925 (estratto da Il Raccoglitore, fasc. 4, ott.-dic. 1925)
- Scritti letterari educativi e patriottici inediti o sparsi di Caterina Franceschi Ferrucci e memorie su la vita e le opere di lei, con note e proemio di Giuseppe Guidetti, Reggio d'Emilia, Tipografia editrice Guidetti, 1932
- Sara Lorenzetti, «Voi sarete... il mio tutto». Un epistolario amoroso di Caterina Franceschi, Firenze, Franco Cesati, 2006

== Bibliography ==
- Giovanni Eroli, Alcune notizie sopra Caterina Franceschi in Ferrucci da Narni, Assisi, Tip. Metastasio, 1888
- Eugenia Ciancarelli Gazzoni, Caterina Franceschi Ferrucci nella letteratura e nella storia, with a preface by Angelo De Gubernatis, Rieti, Tip. F. Faraoni, 1912
- Carlo Fedeli, Caterina Franceschi-Ferrucci nel 25º anno della sua morte. Ricordi familiari, Pisa, Tip. F. Mariotti, 1912
- Gemma Gatta, Caterina Franceschi Ferrucci, Napoli, Tipografia delle Industrie, 1913.
- Gilda Chiari Allegretti, L'educazione nazionale nella vita e negli scritti di Caterina Franceschi-Ferrucci con documenti inediti, Firenze, Le Monnier, 1932
- Anna Santoro, Caterina Franceschi Ferrucci e le Lezioni di Letteratura Italiana, in “Esperienze Letterarie”, n. 3, 1984
- Maria Clotilde Barbarulli, Caterina Franceschi Ferrucci accademica della Crusca, in AA. VV., La Crusca nella tradizione letteraria e linguistica italiana, Firenze, Accademia della Crusca, 1985
- Giuseppina Velardi, Figure di Donne Cattoliche Pisane. Caterina Franceschi Ferrucci, in AA. VV.,Per una storia della Religiosità Pisana, edited by Silvano Burgalassi, Pisa, Pacini Editore, 1987
- Maria Rosaria Bottegal, Caterina Franceschi Ferrucci. Narnese illustre, “Quaderni della Biblioteca di Narni”, n. 2, Bologna, December 1993
- Caterina Franceschi Ferrucci, Della educazione morale della donna italiana, Torino, Giuseppe Pomba e comp., 1847.
