= Jacopo da Lentini =

Italian poet and inventor (13th century)

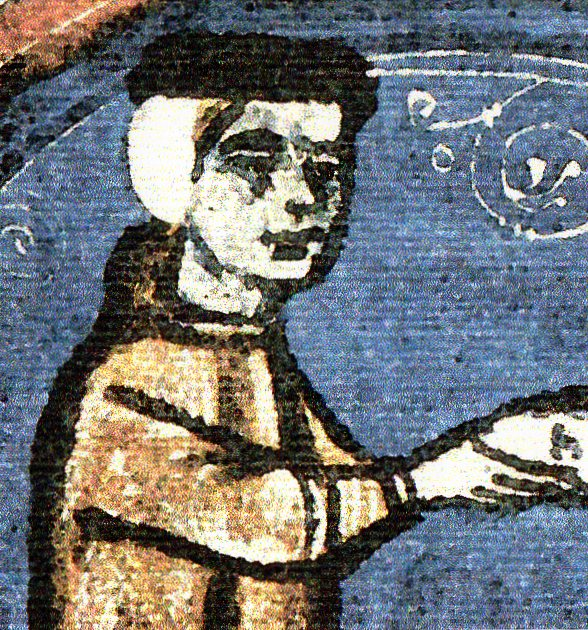
Detail in the National Central Library in Florence

Jacopo da Lentini, also known as Giacomo da Lentini or with the appellative Il Notaro, was a 13th-century Italian poet and inventor. He was a senior poet of the Sicilian School and was a notary at the court of the Holy Roman Emperor Frederick II. Jacopo is credited with the invention of the sonnet. His poetry was originally written in literary Sicilian, though it only survives in Tuscan.

Although some scholars believe that da Lentini's Italian poetry about courtly love was an adaptation of the Provençal poetry of the troubadours, William Baer argues that the first eight lines of the earliest Sicilian sonnets, rhymed ABABABAB, are identical to the eight-line Sicilian folksong stanza known as the Strambotto. Therefore, da Lentini, or whoever else invented the form, added two tercets to the Strambotto in order to create the 14-line Sicilian sonnet.

As with other poets of the time, he corresponded often with fellow poets, circulating poems in manuscript and commenting on others; one of his main correspondents was Pier della Vigna. Some of his sonnets were produced in tenzone, a collaborative form of poetry writing in which one poet would write a sonnet and another would respond, likewise in a sonnet; da Lentini cooperated in this manner with the Abbot of Tivoli.

== A "Canzone" of Jacopo da Lentini ==
This is one of the most popular poems – "Canzone" (Song) – of Jacopo da Lentini. The Italian text is from "I poeti della Scuola siciliana. Vol. 1: Jacopo da Lentini", Milano, Mondadori, 2008, 47–49.

Meravigliosa-mente
un amor mi distringe
e soven ad ogn'ora.
Com'omo che ten mente
in altro exemplo pinge
la simile pintura,
cosí, bella, facc'eo,
che 'nfra lo core meo
porto la tua figura.

In cor par ch'eo vi porti,
pinta come parete,
e non pare di fore;
o Deo, co' mi par forte
non so se vi savete,
com' v'amo di bon core,
ca son sì vergognoso
ca pur vi guardo ascoso,
e non vi mostro amore.

Avendo gran disio
dipinsi una pintura,
bella, voi simigliante,
e quando voi non vio
guardo 'n quella figura,
par ch'eo v'aggia avante:
sì com'om che si crede
salvare per sua fede,
ancor non via davante.

Al cor m'ard'una doglia,
com'om che te-lo foco
a lo suo seno ascoso,
quando più lo 'nvoglia,
tanto arde più loco
e non pò stare incluso:
similemente eo ardo
quando pass'e non guardo
a voi, vis'amoroso.

S'eo guardo quando passo,
inver'voi no mi giro,
bella, per risguardare;
andando, ad ogni passo
sì getto uno sospiro
che facemi ancosciare;
e certo bene ancoscio,
ch'a pena mi conoscio,
tanto bella mi pare.

Assai v'aggio laudato,
madonna, in tutte parti
di bellezze ch'avete.
Non so se v'è contato
ch'eo lo faccia per arti,
che voi ve ne dolete:
sacciatelo per signa
zo ch'e' voi dire' a linga,
quando voi mi vedite.

Canzonetta novella,
và canta nova cosa;
lèvati da maitino
davanti a la piú bella,
fiore d'ogn'amorosa,
bionda piú ch'auro fino:
«Lo vostro amor, ch'è caro,
donatelo al Notaro
ch'è nato da Lentino».

Translation:

Wonderfully
a love binds
and possesses me at every hour,
Like one who keeps a model in his mind
and depicts
a similar likeness,
so, beautiful lady, do I,
because, inside my heart
I carry your image.

I seem to carry in my heart,
your painted likeness,
which is not apparent from outside.
O God, how hard it seems!
I don't know if you know
with what true heart I love you,
for I am so timid
that I watch you in secret
and do not show my love.

Having great desire
I painted a painting,
beautiful lady, of your likeness,
and when I don't see you,
I look upon that image,
and it seems you are before me,
like someone who believes
himself saved through faith,
when he cannot see the way.

In my heart a pain is burning,
like to one who keeps a fire
hidden in his breast.
The more he tries to stifle it,
it burns more widely
and cannot be contained.
Likewise I burn
when I pass and do not look
at you, lovely visage.

If do I pass and look at you
and do not turn around
to look at you again,
beautiful lady,
at every step
I cast a sigh
and am filled so much anguish
that I surely recognize
that I hardly know myself,
so beautiful do you appear to me.

I have praised you so greatly,
my Lady, everywhere
for the beauties you possess.
I don't know if you've been told
that I do it just for art's sake,
and that this pains you.
But you may know through signs
what I would say with my tongue,
when you see how I appear.

O fresh and new little song,
go and sing something new.
Rise up early in the morning
before the most beautiful –
the flower of all the lovelies –
blonder than fine gold:
«Give your love, that is so precious,
to the notary
who was born in Lentini.»

== In popular culture ==
- In Canto 24 of The Purgatorio, Virgil and Dante Alighieri encounter the soul of Jacopo da Lentini.
- Dante Gabriel Rossetti's volume The Early Italian Poets contains his literary translations of the poetry of Jacopo da Lentini, Emperor Frederick, and many other poets of the Sicilian School.
- In Jorge Luis Borges' sonnet Un Poeta del Siglo XIII ("A Poet of the 13th Century"), the unnamed protagonist is Jacopo da Lentini.
