= Abbot of Tivoli =

Italian poet

The Abbot of Tivoli (Italian: Abate di Tivoli) was an Italian poet of the thirteenth century. His birth and death dates are not known, but he was alive at least between 1230 and 1250.

Only three of his sonnets are known, written as an exchange in tenzone with Giacomo da Lentini, concerning the nature of love. The abbot argues a conventional perspective on love: "the abbot predictably complains of unrequited love and pledges his fidelity to the god of love in the hope that the lady, like himself, will be stricken by love's arrow." They were probably composed in Tivoli in 1241, the year that the emperor Frederick II resided there. Some believe that his real name was Walter, laicus de urbe, who was loyal to Pope Innocent IV (who mentions him in a letter dated 1250 as a "pious" supporter).
