= Cecco Angiolieri =

Italian poet

Francesco "Cecco" Angiolieri (Italian pronunciation: [ˈtʃekko andʒoˈljɛːri]; c. 1260 – c. 1312) was an Italian poet.

== Biography ==
Cecco Angiolieri was born in Siena in 1260, son of Angioliero, who was himself the son of Angioliero Solafìca, who was for several years a banker to Pope Gregory IX; his mother was Lisa de' Salimbeni, from one of the noblest and most powerful Senese families.

In 1281, he was with the Guelphs of Siena who were besieging their Ghibelline fellow citizens in the Torri di Maremma, near Roccastrada, Tuscany, and he was fined many times for deserting the battlefield without permission. He was fined again on 11 July 1282 for violating the curfew of Siena, signalled by the third ringing of the commune bells. Cecco was fined again in 1291 under similar circumstances.

He fought with the Florentines against Arezzo in 1288, and it is possible that this was where he met Dante. His Sonnet 100, dated between 1289 and 1294, seems to confirm that the two knew each other, since Cecco refers to a person (a mariscalco) whom they both knew personally ("Lassar vo' lo trovare di Becchina, / Dante Alighieri, e dir del 'mariscalco'"). Around 1296, he left Siena to go into exile for political reasons. We can deduce from Sonnet 102 (from 1302 to 1303), addressed to Dante, who was already in Verona, that during this period, Cecco was in Rome ("s'eo fatto romano, e tu lombardo"). We do not know whether his exile from Siena from 1296 to 1303 was interrupted. The sonnet also shows a definitive break between Cecco and Dante ("Dante Alighier, i' t'averò a stancare / ch'eo so lo pungiglion, e tu se' 'l bue" – "Dante boy, I'll simply wear you out: / since I'm the cattle-prod that drives your ox."). Unfortunately, most of the poetic material relating to Dante has been lost: their poetic dispute, as well as their possible earlier relationship, which then deteriorated.

In 1302, Cecco had to sell off his vineyard to one Neri Perini del Popolo di Sant'Andrea for seven hundred lire, and this is the last information that is available from Angiolieri's lifetime.

From a later document (25 February 1313), we know that five of his children (Meo, Deo, Angioliero, Arbolina and Sinione- another daughter, Tessa, had already left the household) renounced their inheritance because the estate was too far in debt. It is therefore possible to assume that Cecco Angiolieri died in Siena around 1310, perhaps between 1312 and the beginning of 1313.

== Works ==
There are about 110 sonnets attributed to Angiolieri (including some twenty of dubious provenance), which pick up the goliardic tradition and the tradition of poesia giocosa, and which, using colourful and realistic expressions, were impudent and light-heartedly blasphemous.

== In music ==
Three sonnets were set as art songs for soprano and pianoforte by Davide Verotta, see "Rime di Cecco". 2022.. The sonnet S'ì fosse foco, arderei 'l mondo (If I were fire, I would burn the world), was set to music in 1968 (as "S'i' fosse foco") by popular singer-songwriter Fabrizio de André.

== Criticism ==
The most recent criticism holds that it is not correct to search for autobiographical references in his compositions, given the strangely literary character of his poems. Even in those poems which seem most personal, we find a taste for parody and caricature, and stylistic exaggeration, in which emotions and passions are the pretext for linguistic games. In these extreme expressions, there is an enjoyment of impressing the reader, and the rejection of the ideals of courtly life and of the dolce stil novo. We are faced with a refined man of letters who knows well how to calculate his effects.

== See also ==
- Becchin’amor! – Che vuo’, falso tradito?

== Texts ==
- I sonetti di Cecco Angiolieri editi criticamente ed illustrati ed. Aldo Francesco Massera, Zanichelli Editore, Bologna, 1906
- Aldo Francesco Massera, Sonetti burleschi e realistici dei primi due secoli, Casa editrice Giuseppe Laterza & figli|Laterza, Bari 1920, vol. I, pp. 63–138 (text), vol. II, pp. 82–92 e 127–136 (notes).
- Cecco Angiolieri, Il Canzoniere, ed. Carlo Steiner, UTET, Torino, 1925.
- Aldo Francesco Massera, Sonetti burleschi e realistici dei primi due secoli, ed. Luigi Russo. Casa editrice Giuseppe Laterza & figli|Laterza, Bari, 1940, pp. 63–138 (text), 330–340 (notes), 375–384 (annotations) and 409 (notes by Luigi Russo).
- Mario Marti, Poeti giocosi del tempo di Dante, RCS MediaGroup|Rizzoli, Milano 1956, pp. 113–250.
- Maurizio Vitale, Rimatori comico-realistici del Due e Trecento, 2 vols. UTET, Torino 1956, vol. I, pp. 259–455.
- Cecco Angiolieri, Rime, ed. Gigi Cavalli, Biblioteca Universale Rizzoli, Milano 1959, ISBN 978-88-17-12017-3
- Gianfranco Contini, Poeti del Duecento, 2 vols. Riccardo Ricciardi|Ricciardi, Milano-Napoli 1960, vol. II, pp. 367–401 (text) e 883–885 (notes).
- Cecco Angiolieri, Le Rime, ed. Antonio Lanza, Archivio Guido Izzi, Rome, 1990, ISBN 978-88-85760-18-9
- Cecco Angiolieri, Rime, ed. Raffaella Castagnola, Mursia, Milano 1995, ISBN 88-425-1841-7.
- Cecco Angiolieri, Sonetti, ed. Menotti Stanghellini, Il Leccio, Monteriggioni, 2003, ISBN 978-88-86507-96-7.
- Cecco Angiolieri, Cecco As I Am and Was: The Poems of Cecco Angiolieri, trans. Tracy Barrett. Boston: International Pocket Library, 1994.

=== Commentary ===
- Peirone, Luigi (1979). La coscienza dello stile "comico" in Cecco Angiolieri. Savona: Sabatelli.
- Suitner, Franco (1983). La poesia satirica e giocosa nell'età dei comuni. Padova: Editrice Antenore. ISBN 978-88-8455-294-5.
- Landoni, Elena (1997). La grammatica come storia della poesia. Un nuovo disegno storiografico per la letteratura italiana delle origini attraverso grammatica, retorica e semantica. Roma: Bulzoni Editore. ISBN 88-8319-045-9.
- Paolo Orvieto, Lucia Brestolini (2000). La poesia comico-realistica. Dalle origini al Cinquecento. Roma: Carocci. ISBN 978-88-430-1526-9.
- Alfie, Fabian (2001). Comedy and Culture. Cecco Angiolieri's Poetry and Late Medieval Society. Leeds: Northern Universities Press. ISBN 1-902653-43-2.
- Stefano Carrai; Giuseppe Marrani, eds. (2005). Cecco Angiolieri e la poesia satirica medievale. Tavarnuzze - Impruneta: SISMEL - Edizioni del Galluzzo. ISBN 88-8450-180-6.
- Stanghellini, Menotti (2007). La grande rapina ai danni di Cecco Angiolieri, bisessuale, il nemico di Dante. Monteriggioni: Il Leccio. ISBN 978-88-89184-21-9.
- Calenda, Corrado (2007). "Tra inosservanza e trasgressione: poeti giocosi e realistici tra Due e Trecento". Gli "irregolari" nella letteratura: eterodossi, parodisti, funamboli della parola : atti del Convegno di Catania, 31 ottobre-2 novembre 2005. Roma: Salerno Editrice. pp. 31–49. ISBN 978-88-8402-560-9.
- Marrani, Giuseppe (2007). I ‘pessimi parenti’ di Cecco. Note di lettura per due sonetti angioliereschi, «Per leggere», XII, pp. 6-22.
- Marrani, Giuseppe (2012). Il «logro» di Cecco. Nota per «Tre cose solamente m’ènno in grado», in L’entusiasmo delle opere. Studi in memoria di Domenico De Robertis, a cura di I. Becherucci, S. Giusti e N. Tonelli, Lecce, Pensa MultiMedia, pp. 451–7.
- Marrani, Giuseppe (2013). Identità di Becchina, in identità / diversità. Atti del III convegno dipartimentale dell’Università per Stranieri di Siena (Siena, 4–5 dicembre 2012), a cura di T. de Rogatis, G. Marrani, A. Patat e V. Russi, Pisa, Pacini, pp. 95–107.
- Marrani, Giuseppe (2015). Filologia e pratica del commento. Ripensare Cecco Angiolieri, in La pratica del commento, Atti del convegno dell’Università per Stranieri di Siena, 14–16 ottobre 2014, a cura di D. Brogi, T. de Rogatis, G. Marrani, Pisa, Pacini, pp. 45–65.
- Jermini, Fabio (2017). La configurazione metrica dei sonetti di Cecco Angiolieri, in Otto studi sul sonetto. Dai Siciliani al Manierismo, a cura di Arnaldo Soldani e Laura Facini, «Storie e Linguaggi», Padova, Libreriauniversitaria.it edizioni, pp. 41–58.
- Jermini, Fabio (2018) Sulle definizioni del realismo letterario nella poesia del Due-Trecento, in Aldo Francesco Massèra. Tra Scuola Storica e Nuova Filologia, Atti del convegno internazionale di studi, Genève, 3–4 dicembre 2015, a cura di Roberto Leporatti e Anna Bettarini Bruni, «Quaderni ginevrini d’italianistica», Lecce-Brescia, Pensa MultiMedia, pp. 99–119.
