= Lamentation (disambiguation) =

A lamentation, or lament, is a song, poem, or piece of music expressing grief, regret, or mourning.

Lamentation may also refer to:

- Lamentation (Pietà), a painting by Petrus Christus, c. 1444
- Lamentation (The Mourning of Christ), a painting by Giotto in the 14th Century.
- Lamentation (ballet), a 1930 ballet by Martha Graham
- "Lamentation" (Millennium), an episode of Millennium
- Lamentation (novel), a historical mystery novel by C. J. Sansom
- Lamentation, a 2009 fantasy novel by Ken Scholes
- Lamentation Mountain, a mountain near Meriden, Connecticut, U.S.
  - Lamentation Mountain State Park

== See also ==
- Lamentation of Christ, a common subject in Christian art
- Book of Lamentations, a poetic book of the Hebrew Bible
- The Lamentations of a Sinner, by Catherine Parr, the sixth wife of King Henry VIII of England
- Lamentations (disambiguation)
- Lament (disambiguation)
