= Lament (disambiguation) =

A lament is a song, poem, or piece of music expressing grief, regret, or mourning.

Lament(s) may also refer to:

== Literature ==
- Laments (Kochanowski), a 16th-century series of threnodies
- "The Lament", or Li Sao, a Chinese poem

== Music ==
- Lament bass, a free musical form

=== Bands ===
- Lament (band), a Mexican band

=== Albums ===
- Lament (Einstürzende Neubauten album), 2014
- Lament (Frank Morgan album), 1986
- Lament (I've album), 2003
- Lament (Resurrection Band album), 1995
- Lament (Touché Amoré album), 2020
- Lament (Ultravox album), and the title song (see below), 1984
- Lament (Lacrimosa album), 2025

=== Songs/tracks ===
- "Lament" (Ultravox song), 1984
- "Lament", by The Cure, B-side of the single "The Walk"
- "Lament", by Frederik Magle from Like a Flame
- "Lament", by Galneryus from Angel of Salvation
- "Lament", by Gryphon from Red Queen to Gryphon Three
- "Lament", by King Crimson from Starless and Bible Black
- "Lament", by Paul McCartney from Standing Stone
- "Lament", by Serenity from Death & Legacy
- "Lament", by Tesseract from One
- "Lament", from the musical Evita
- "Lament", composed by J. J. Johnson
- "Lamento" ("Lament"), a 2002 song by Gian Marco

== See also ==
- Lamentation (disambiguation)
- Lamentations (disambiguation)
- Laments for Josiah, a biblical passage in 2 Chronicles
- Lamento Borincano ('Puerto Rican Mourning'), a composition by Rafael Hernández Marín
