= Lamentation over the Dead Christ (Perugino) =

Painting by Pietro Perugino

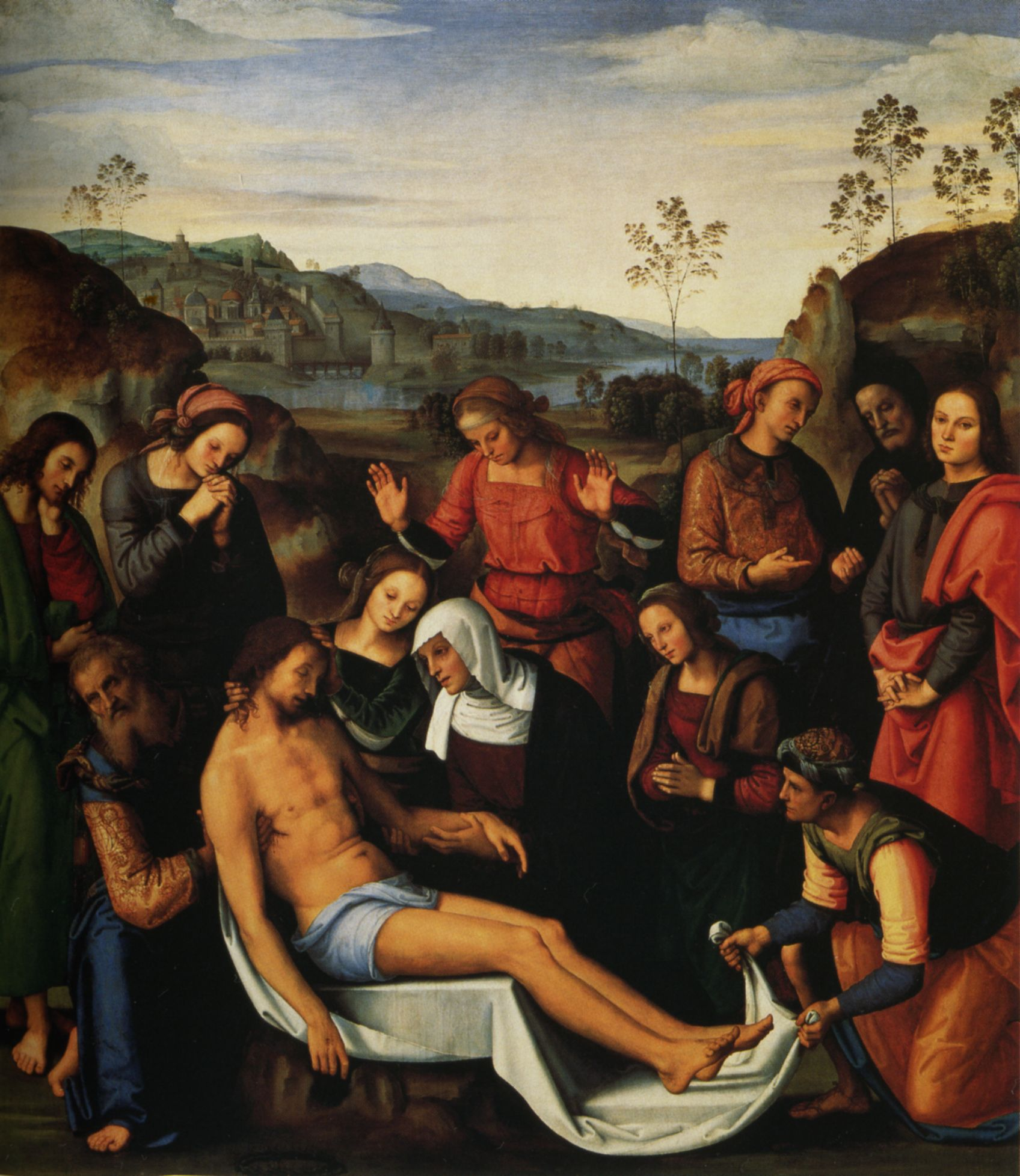
- Artist: Pietro Perugino
- Year: 1495
- Type: Oil on wood
- Dimensions: 220 cm × 195 cm (87 in × 77 in)
- Location: Galleria Palatina, Florence

The Lamentation over the Dead Christ is a painting of the common subject of the Lamentation of Christ by the Italian Renaissance painter Pietro Perugino, executed in 1495 and now in the Galleria Palatina of Palazzo Pitti, Florence, Italy.

== History ==
The painting was commissioned by the Poor Clares of the convent of Santa Chiara in Florence. Highly admired by its contemporaries, the work inspired other paintings such as Fra Bartolomeo's Pietà and Andrea del Sarto's Luco Pietà, both in the same collection.

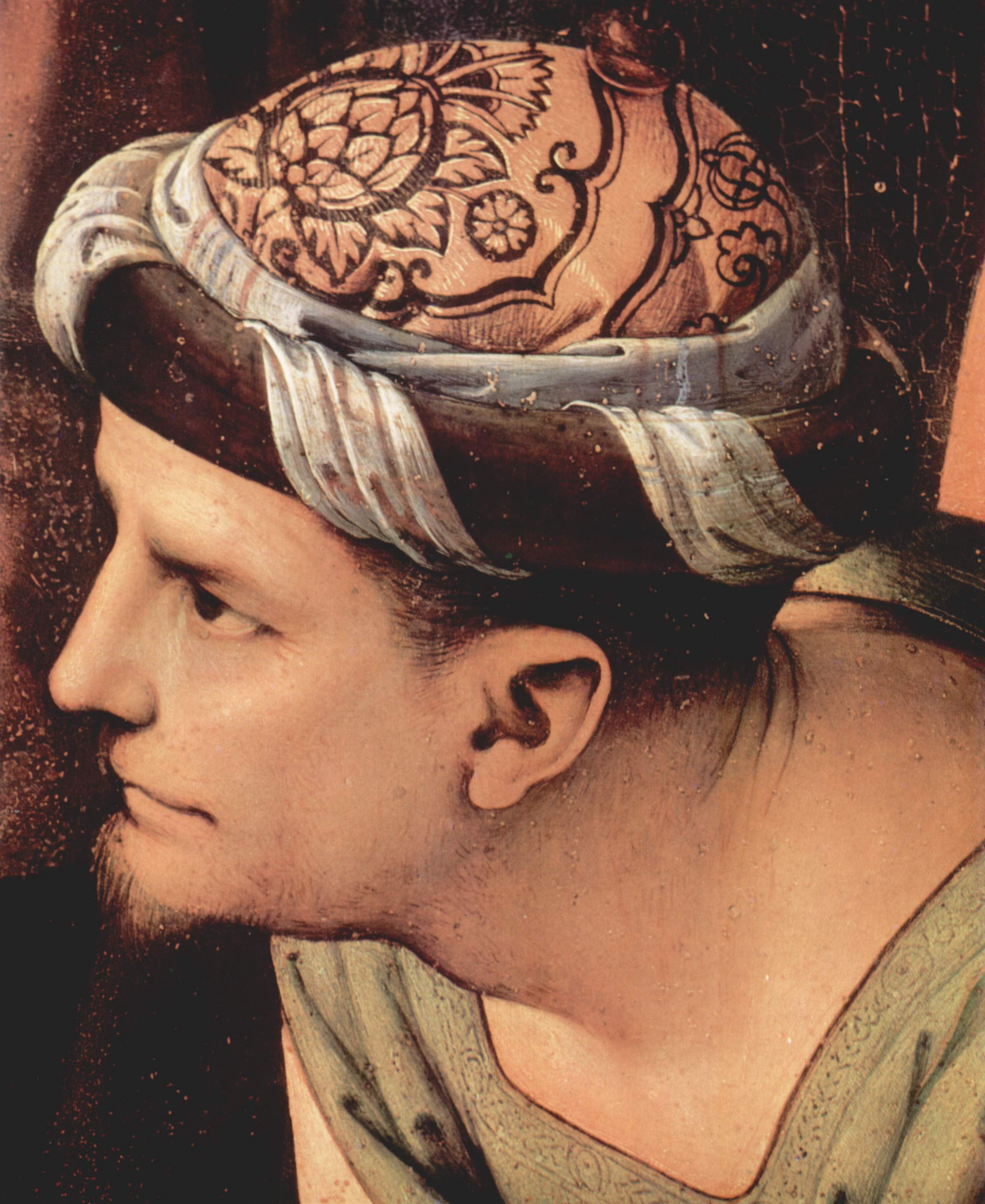
Detail of Joseph of Arimatea.

During the Napoleonic invasion of Italy, it was transferred to Paris (1799), where it remained until 1814. Initially housed at the Gallerie dell'Accademia, it was moved to Palazzo Pitti in 1834.

== Description ==
The work is emblematic of Perugino's style, due to the presence of numerous figures and attitudes, creating a calm scene of contemplation, in order to ease a religious contemplation without renouncing to a sense of harmony and beauty.

Over a hilly background with a lake and a fortified city, is the scene of the Lamentation, which occupies the foreground of lower half of the painting. The body of Jesus is at the center, lying over a white shroud and held by one of the Pious Women, by Nicodemus and by Joseph of Arimathea. The latter dons a richly decorated hat with flowers.

The Virgin is holding one of Jesus's arms, looking at him pathetically. In the middle is Mary Magdalene, with brilliant red clothes, forming one of the three vertexes of an ideal triangle, the others being Joseph and Nicodemus. At the sides are two groups of figures: on the left, John the Apostle and a Pious Woman, on the right three men who are discussing amongst them.

== Sources ==
- Garibaldi, Vittoria (2004). "Perugino". Pittori del Rinascimento. Florence: Scala. ISBN 888117099X.
