= Lamentations (disambiguation) =

The Book of Lamentations is part of the Old Testament or Hebrew Bible.

Lamentations may also refer to:

- Lamentations (Solstice album), a 1994 album by British doom metal band Solstice
- Lamentations (Ngaiire album), a 2014 album by Australian singer Ngaiire
- Lamentations (William Basinski album), a 2018 album by American avant-garde composer and musician William Basinski
- Lamentations (Live at Shepherd's Bush Empire 2003), a live DVD by the band Opeth
- "Lamentations of Jeremiah the Prophet" from the celebration of Tenebrae in Roman Catholic and certain other Christian denominations
- The Holy Saturday Lamentation hymns in Eastern Orthodoxy
- A service that some traditions of Eastern Orthodoxy celebrate for the Feast of the Dormition, which is known by some as the "Lamentations of the Theotokos".
- The Book of Lamentations by Gregory of Narek, c. 1002
- The Book of Lamentations (Oficio de tinieblas), a 1962 novel by Mexican author Rosario Castellanos

== See also ==
- Lament (disambiguation)
- Lamentation (disambiguation)
- Laments (Kochanowski) by 16th-century Polish poet Jan Kochanowski
