= Lamentation of Christ (Heemskerck) =

Painting by Maarten van Heemskerck

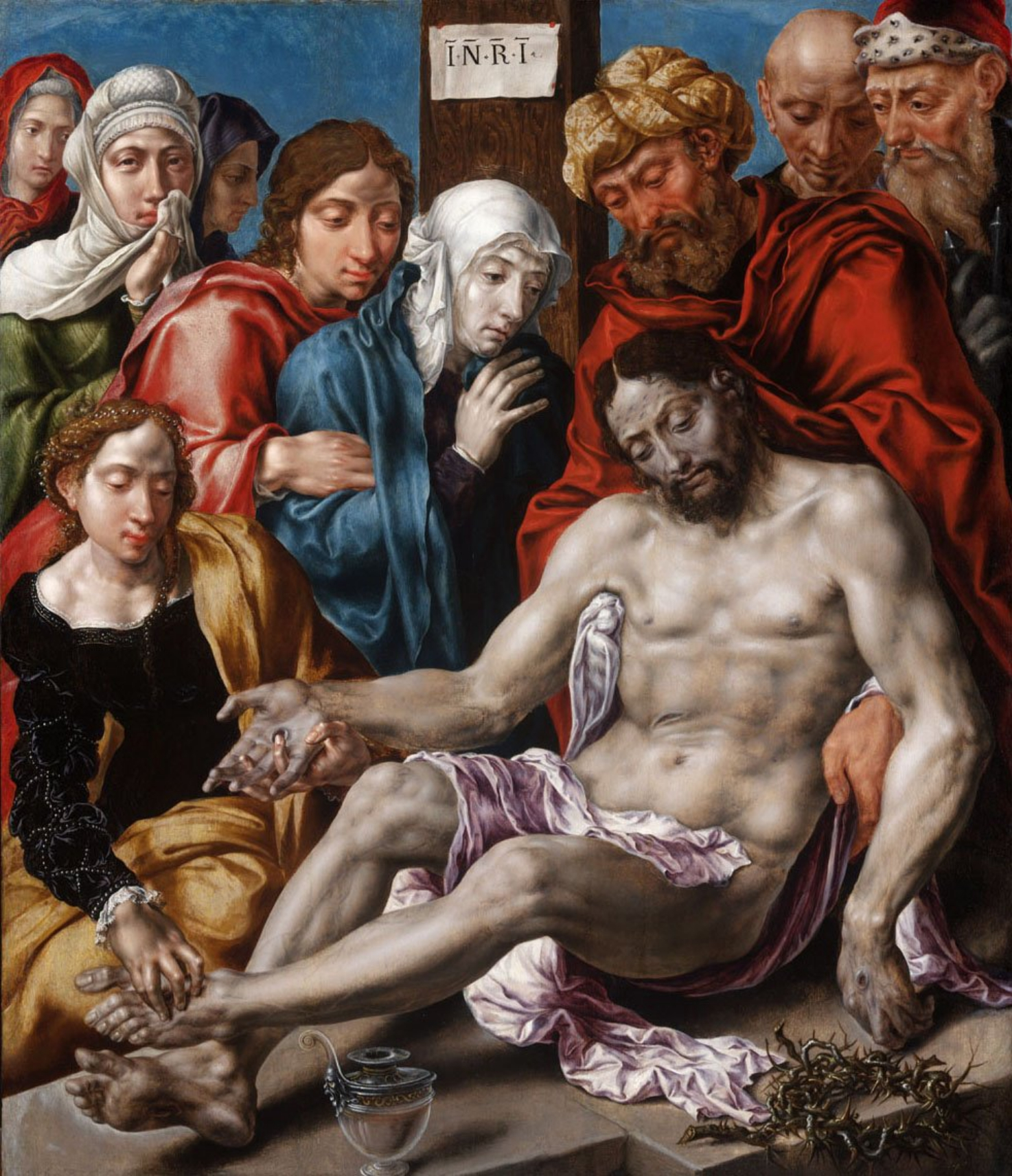
- Artist: Maarten van Heemskerck
- Year: c. 1540 (Julian)
- Medium: oil paint, panel
- Dimensions: 78.5 cm (30.9 in) × 67.5 cm (26.6 in)
- Location: Museum of Fine Arts, Munich Central Collecting Point

Lamentation of Christ is a c. 1540 panel painting of the common subject of the Lamentation of Christ by the Dutch Renaissance painter Maarten van Heemskerck in the Museum of Fine Arts, Budapest.

The panel shows the lamentation of Christ with Christ in the arms of Joseph of Arimathea with his mother supported by John and Mary Magdalene at his feet. He lies on the cold stone with the crown of thorns and the salve pot below his feet. The painting was gifted on the occasion of the museum's opening in 1916 by Marcell Nemes.

The painting was restored in 2007 when several more figures were revealed behind the main group.

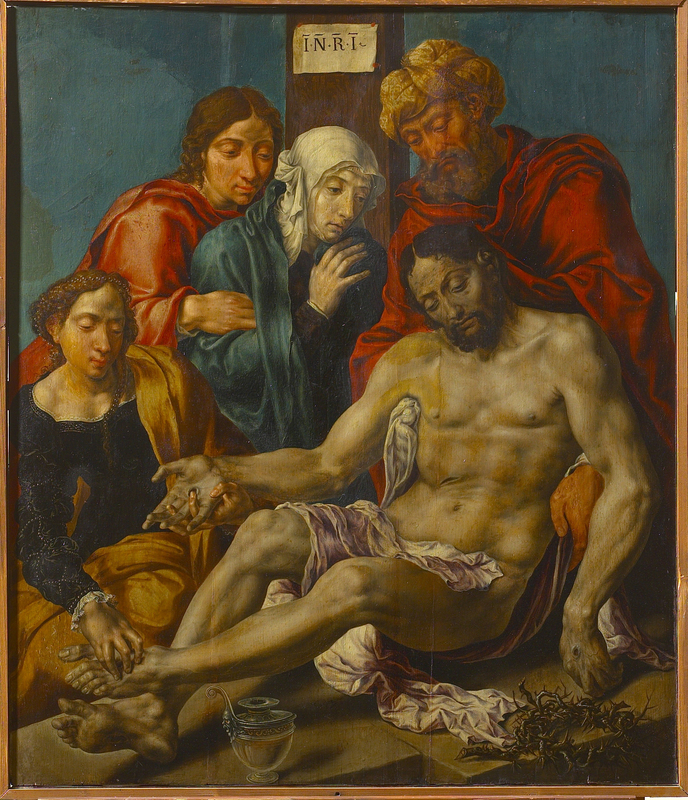
Painting before restoration

The painting is typical of Heemskerck's style after his return from Italy, showing his tendency to crowd figures to fill the space. It formed part of an exhibition of paintings from Haarlem held by the Budapest museum at the Frans Hals Museum in 2016.
