= Giotto =

Italian painter and architect (c. 1267–1337)

Giotto di Bondone
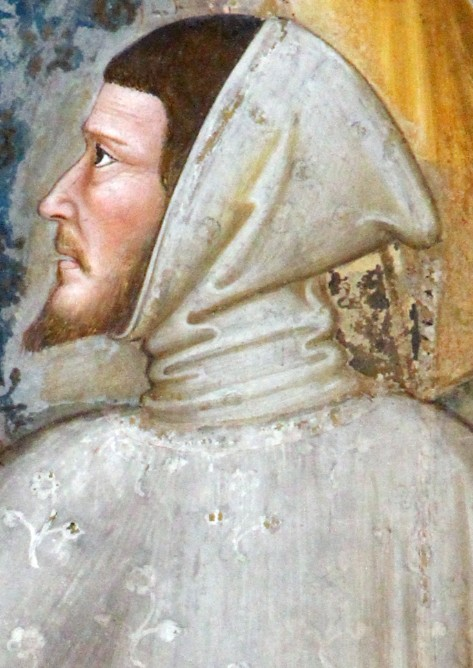
- Portrait by Andrea di Bonaiuto, c. 1366
- Born: Giotto di Bondone c. 1267 near Florence, Republic of Florence
- Died: January 8, 1337 (aged 69–70); Florence, Republic of Florence
- Known for: Painting; fresco; architecture
- Notable work: Scrovegni Chapel frescoes; Campanile
- Movement: Late Gothic; Proto-Renaissance
- Spouse: Ricevuta di Lapo del Pela (m. 1290)

Giotto di Bondone (Italian: [ˈdʒɔtto di bonˈdoːne]; c. 1267 (Note: The year of his birth is calculated from the fact that Antonio Pucci, the town crier of Florence, wrote a poem in Giotto's honour in which it is stated that he was 70 at the time of his death. However, the word "seventy" fits into the rhyme of the poem better than any longer and more complex age so it is possible that Pucci used artistic license.) – January 8, 1337), known mononymously as Giotto, (Note: UK: /ˈdʒɒtoʊ/ JOT-oh US: /dʒiˈɒtoʊ, ˈdʒɔːtoʊ/ jee-OT-oh, JAW-toh)) was an Italian painter and architect from Florence during the Late Middle Ages. He worked during the Gothic and Proto-Renaissance period. Giotto's contemporary, the banker and chronicler Giovanni Villani, wrote that Giotto was "the most sovereign master of painting in his time, who drew all his figures and their postures according to nature" and of his publicly recognized "talent and excellence". Giorgio Vasari described Giotto as making a decisive break from the prevalent Byzantine style and as initiating "the great art of painting as we know it today, introducing the technique of drawing accurately from life, which had been neglected for more than two hundred years".

Giotto's masterwork is the decoration of the Scrovegni Chapel, in Padua, also known as the Arena Chapel, which was completed around 1305. The fresco cycle depicts the Life of the Virgin and the Life of Christ. It is regarded as one of the supreme masterpieces of the Early Renaissance.

The fact that Giotto painted the Arena Chapel and that he was chosen by the Commune of Florence in 1334 to design the new campanile (bell tower) of the Florence Cathedral are among the few certainties about his life. Almost every other aspect of it is subject to controversy: his birth date, his birthplace, his appearance, his apprenticeship, the order in which he created his works, whether he painted the famous frescoes in the Upper Basilica of Saint Francis in Assisi, and his burial place.

== Early life and career ==
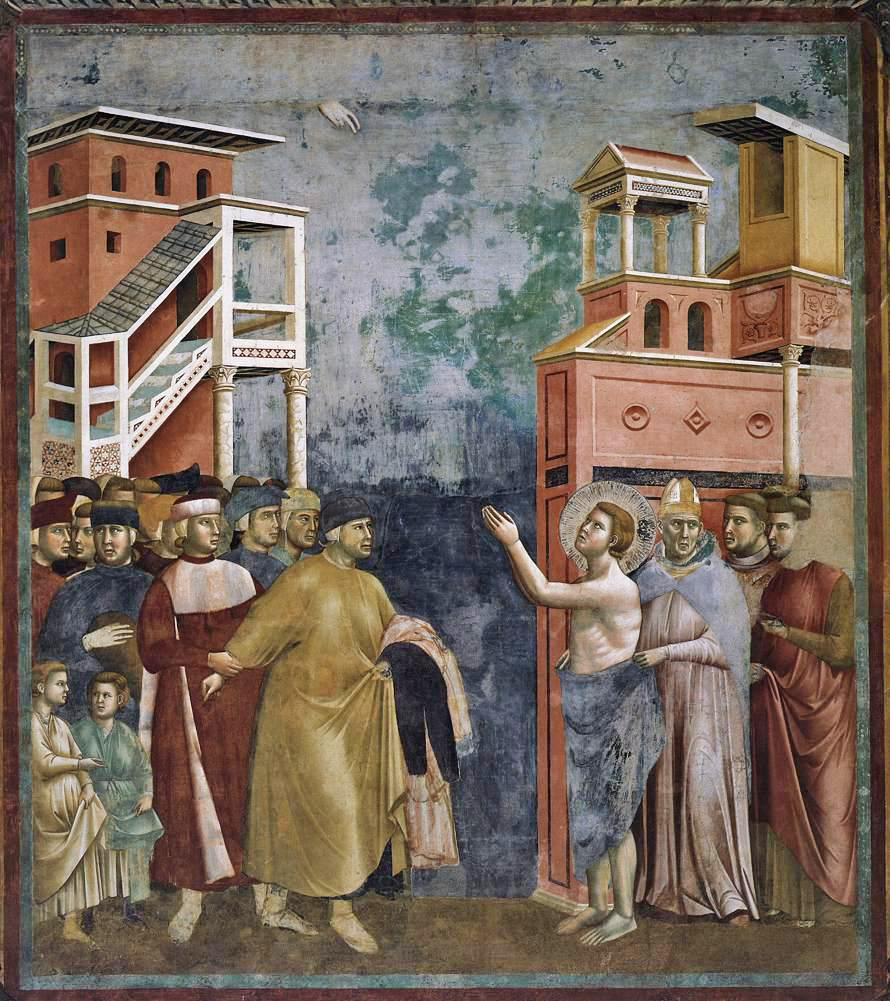
One of the Legend of St. Francis frescoes at Assisi, the authorship of which is disputed

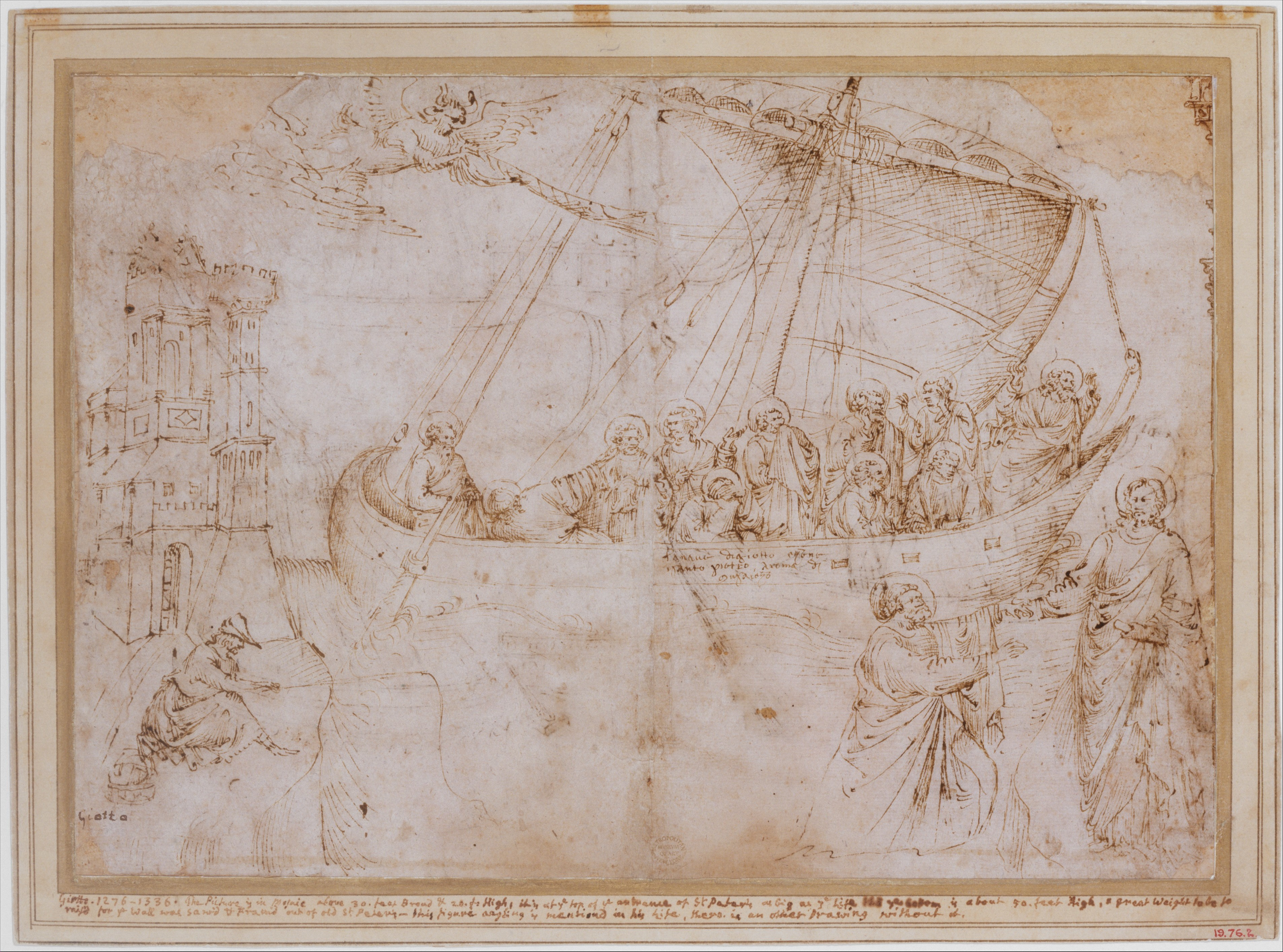
Drawing of Giotto's lost mosaic Navicella, made about 1420 and once owned by Vasari

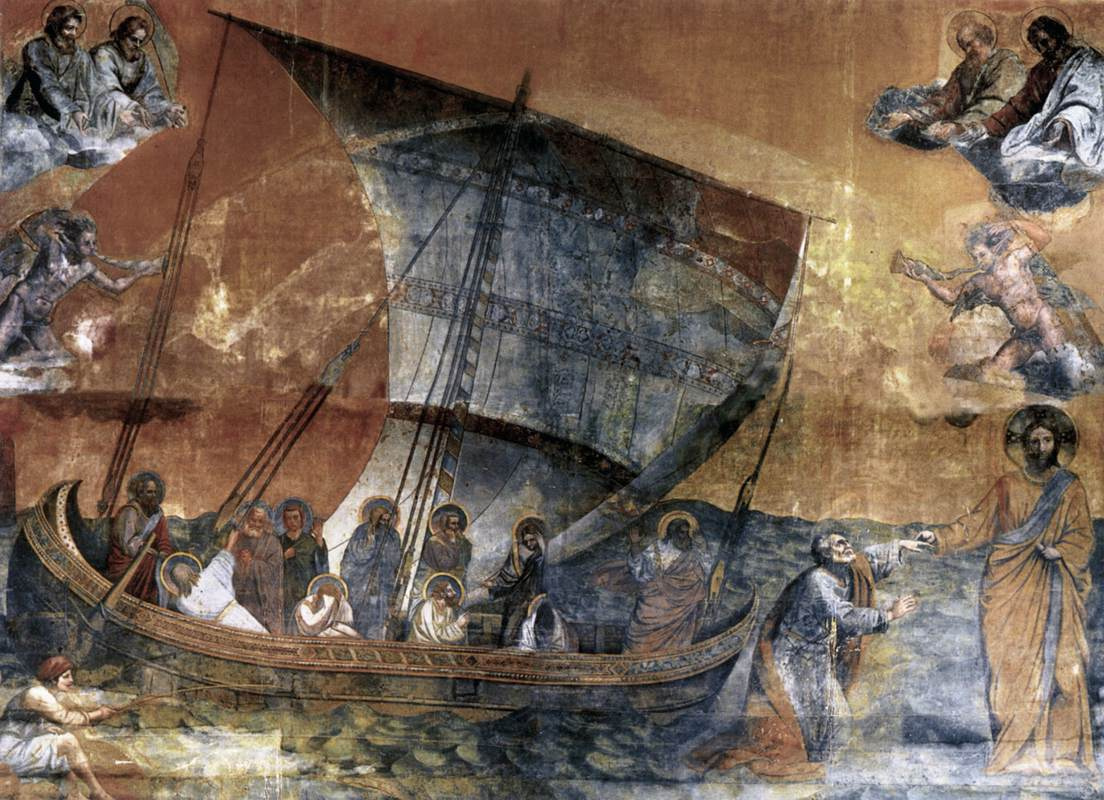
Full-size copy in oils of Giotto's lost mosaic Navicella, made in 1628

Tradition says that Giotto was born in a farmhouse, perhaps at Colle di Romagnano or Romignano. Since 1850, a tower house in nearby Colle Vespignano has borne a plaque claiming the honor of his birthplace, an assertion that is commercially publicized. However, recent research has presented documentary evidence that he was born in Florence, the son of a blacksmith. His father's name was Bondone. Most authors accept that Giotto was his real name, but may have been an abbreviation of Ambrogio (Ambrogiotto) or Angelo (Angelotto).

In his Lives of the Most Excellent Painters, Sculptors, and Architects Vasari states that Giotto was a shepherd boy, a merry and intelligent child who was loved by all who knew him. The great Florentine painter Cimabue discovered Giotto drawing pictures of his sheep on a rock. They were so lifelike that Cimabue approached Giotto and asked if he could take him on as an apprentice. Cimabue was one of the two most highly renowned painters of Tuscany, the other being Duccio, who worked mainly in Siena. Vasari recounts a number of such stories about Giotto's skill as a young artist. He tells of one occasion when Cimabue was absent from the workshop, and Giotto painted a remarkably lifelike fly on a face in a painting of Cimabue. When Cimabue returned, he tried several times to brush the fly off. Many scholars today are uncertain about Giotto's training and consider Vasari's account that he was Cimabue's pupil a legend; they cite earlier sources that suggest that Giotto was not Cimabue's pupil. The story about the fly is also suspect because it parallels Pliny the Elder's anecdote about Zeuxis painting grapes so lifelike that birds tried to peck at them.

Vasari also relates that when Pope Benedict XI sent a messenger to Giotto, asking him to send a drawing to demonstrate his skill, Giotto drew a red circle so perfect that it seemed as though it was drawn using a pair of compasses and instructed the messenger to send it to the Pope. The messenger departed ill-pleased, believing that he had been made a fool of. The messenger brought other artists' drawings back to the Pope in addition to Giotto's. When the messenger related how he had made the circle without moving his arm and without the aid of compasses the Pope and his courtiers were amazed at how Giotto's skill greatly surpassed all of his contemporaries.

== Career ==
Around 1290 Giotto married Ricevuta di Lapo del Pela (known as 'Ciuta'), the daughter of Lapo del Pela of Florence. The marriage produced four daughters and four sons, one of whom, Francesco, became a painter. Giotto worked in Rome in 1297–1300, but few traces of his presence there remain today. By 1301, Giotto owned a house in Florence, and when he was not traveling, he would return there and live in comfort with his family. By the early 1300s, he had multiple painting commissions in Florence. The Archbasilica of St. John Lateran houses a small portion of a fresco cycle, painted for the Jubilee of 1300 called by Boniface VIII. He also designed the Navicella, a mosaic that decorated the facade of Old St Peter's Basilica. In this period Giotto also painted the Badia Polyptych, now in the Uffizi, Florence.

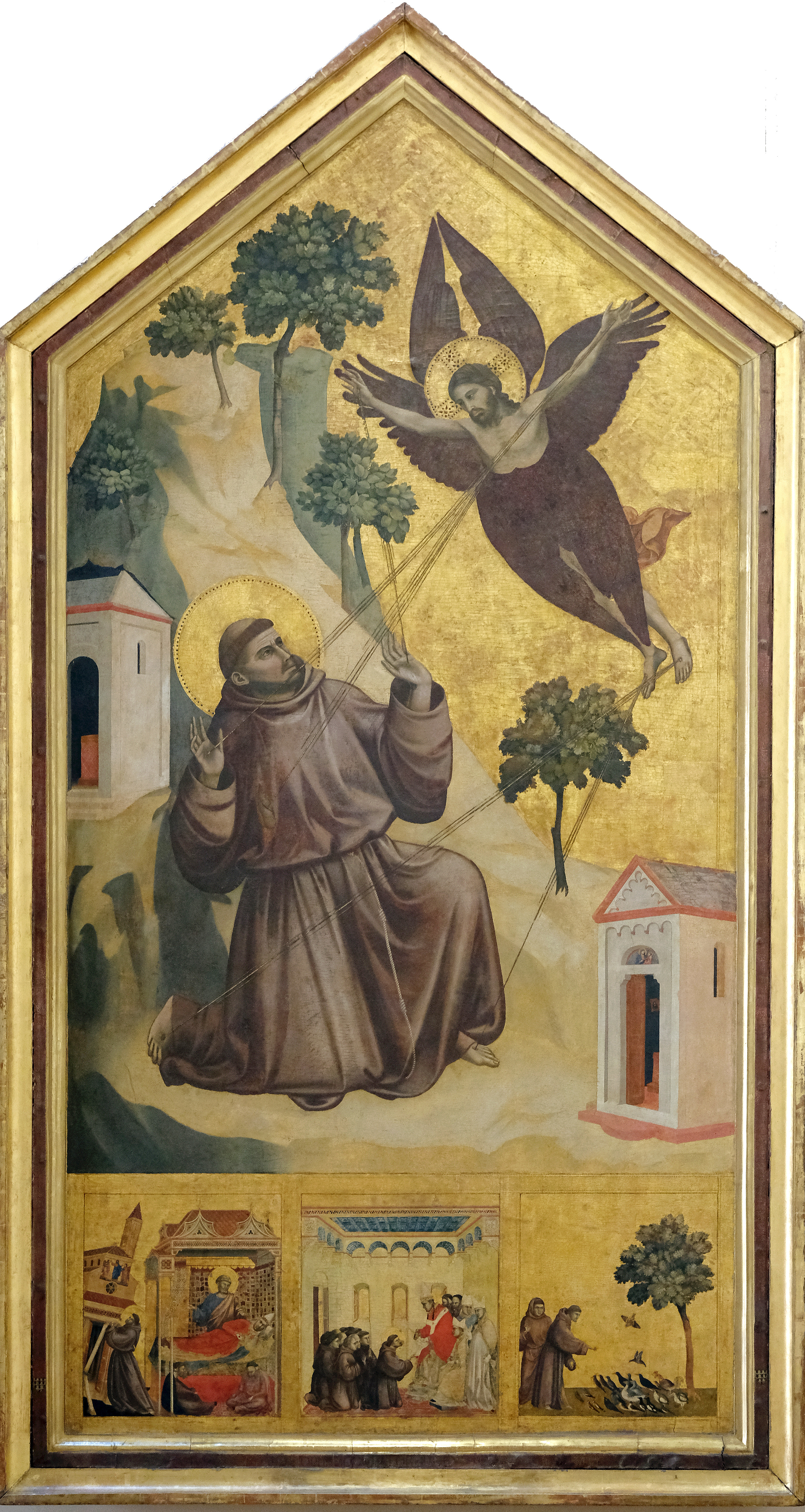
Saint Francis receiving the Stigmata

Cimabue went to Assisi to paint several large frescoes at the new Basilica of Saint Francis of Assisi, and it is possible, but not certain, that Giotto went with him. The attribution of the fresco cycle of the Life of St. Francis in the Upper Church has been one of the most disputed in art history. The documents of the Franciscan Friars that relate to artistic commissions during this period were destroyed by Napoleon's troops, who stabled horses in the Upper Church of the Basilica, so scholars have debated the attribution to Giotto. In the absence of evidence to the contrary, it was convenient to attribute every fresco in the Upper Church not obviously by Cimabue to the better-known Giotto, including those frescoes now attributed to the Master of Isaac. In the 1960s, art experts Millard Meiss and Leonetto Tintori examined all of the Assisi frescoes, and found some of the paint contained white lead—also used in Cimabue's badly deteriorated Crucifixion (c. 1283). No known works by Giotto contain this medium. However, Giotto's panel painting of the Stigmatization of St. Francis (c. 1297) includes a motif of the saint holding up the collapsing church, previously included in the Assisi frescoes.

The authorship of a large number of panel paintings ascribed to Giotto by Vasari, among others, is as broadly disputed as the Assisi frescoes. According to Vasari, Giotto's earliest works were for the Dominicans at Santa Maria Novella. They include a fresco of The Annunciation and an enormous suspended Crucifix, which is about 5 metres (16 feet) high. It has been dated to about 1290 and is thought to be contemporary with the Assisi frescoes. Earlier attributed works are the San Giorgio alla Costa Madonna and Child, now in the Diocesan Museum of Santo Stefano al Ponte, Florence, and the signed panel of the Stigmatization of St. Francis housed in the Louvre.

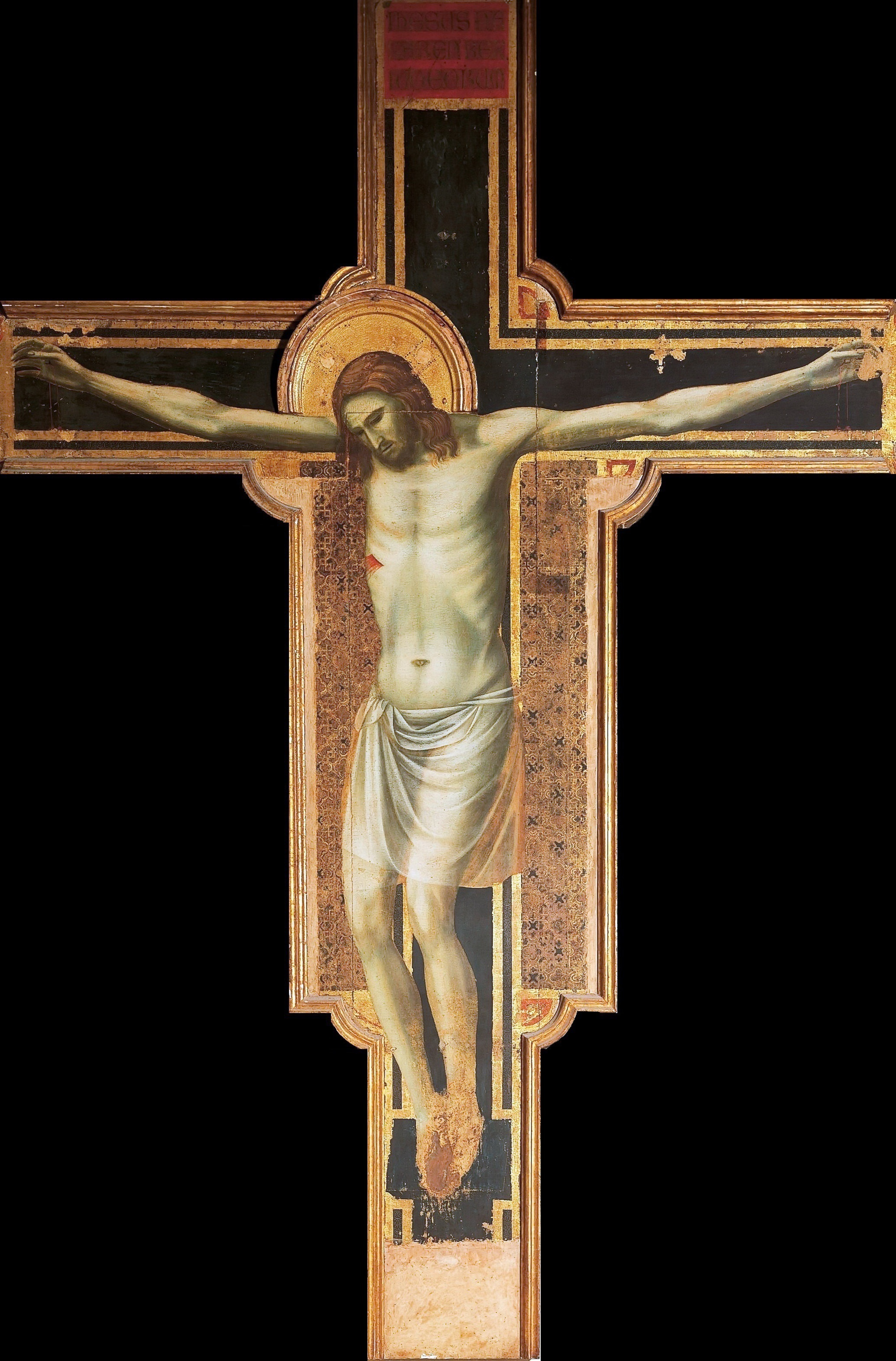
The Crucifixion of Rimini

An early biographical source, Riccobaldo of Ferrara, mentions that Giotto painted at Assisi but does not specify the St Francis Cycle: "What kind of art [Giotto] made is testified to by works done by him in the Franciscan churches at Assisi, Rimini, Padua ...". Since the idea was put forward by the German art historian Friedrich Rintelen in 1912, many scholars have expressed doubt that Giotto was the author of the Upper Church frescoes. Without documentation, arguments on the attribution have relied upon connoisseurship, a notoriously unreliable "science", but technical examinations and comparisons of the workshop painting processes at Assisi and Padua in 2002 have provided strong evidence that Giotto did not paint the St. Francis Cycle. There are many differences between it and the Arena Chapel frescoes that are difficult to account for within the stylistic development of an individual artist. It is now generally accepted that four different hands are identifiable in the Assisi St. Francis frescoes and that they came from Rome. If this is the case, Giotto's frescoes at Padua owe much to the naturalism of the painters.

Giotto's fame as a painter spread. He was called to work in Padua and also in Rimini, where there remains only a Crucifix painted before 1309 and conserved in the Church of St. Francis. It influenced the rise of the Riminese school of Giovanni and Pietro da Rimini. According to documents of 1301 and 1304, Giotto by this time possessed large estates in Florence, and it is probable that he was already leading a large workshop and receiving commissions from throughout Italy.

== Scrovegni Chapel ==
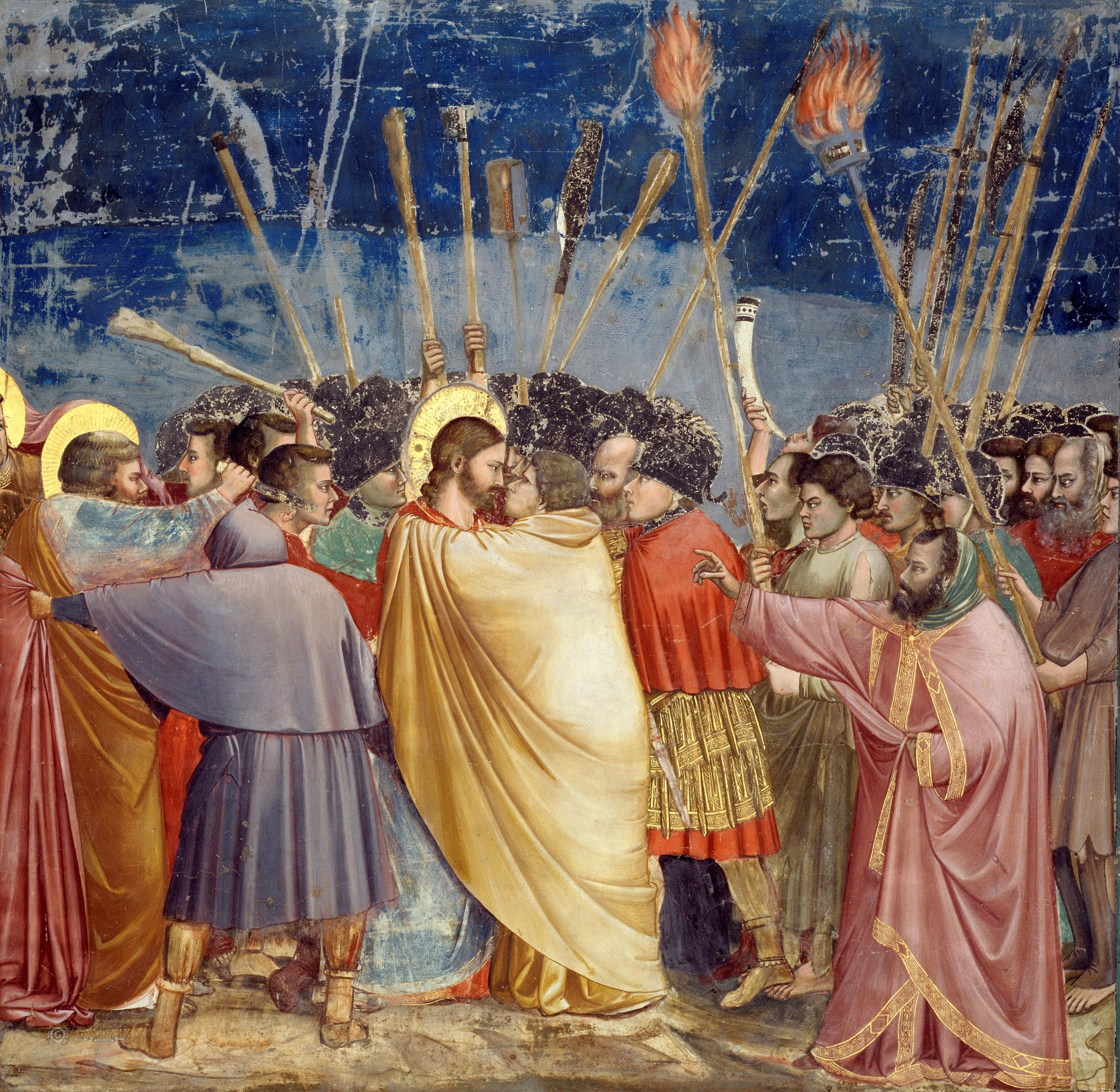
Kiss of Judas, Scrovegni Chapel

Around 1305, Giotto executed his most influential work, the interior frescoes of the Scrovegni Chapel in Padua. Enrico degli Scrovegni commissioned the chapel to serve as family worship, burial space and as a backdrop for an annually performed mystery play.

The theme of the decoration is Salvation, and there is an emphasis on the Virgin Mary, as the chapel is dedicated to the Annunciation and to the Virgin of Charity. As was common in church decoration of medieval Italy, the west wall is dominated by the Last Judgement. On either side of the chancel are complementary paintings of the angel Gabriel and the Virgin Mary, depicting the Annunciation. The scene is incorporated into the cycles of The Life of the Blessed Virgin Mary and The Life of Christ. Giotto's inspiration for The Life of the Virgin cycle was probably taken from The Golden Legend by Jacobus de Voragine and The Life of Christ draws upon the Meditations on the Life of Christ as well as the Bible. The frescoes are more than mere illustrations of familiar texts, however, and scholars have found numerous sources for Giotto's interpretations of sacred stories.

Vasari, drawing on a description by Giovanni Boccaccio, a friend of Giotto's, says of him that "there was no uglier man in the city of Florence" and indicates that his children were also plain in appearance. There is a story that Dante visited Giotto while he was painting the Scrovegni Chapel and, seeing the artist's children underfoot asked how a man who painted such beautiful pictures could have such plain children. Giotto, who according to Vasari was always a wit, replied, "I make my pictures by day, and my babies by night."

=== Sequence ===
The cycle is divided into 37 scenes, arranged around the lateral walls in three tiers, starting in the upper register with the story of St. Joachim and St. Anne, the parents of the Virgin, and continuing with her early life. The life of Jesus occupies two registers. The top south tier deals with the lives of Mary's parents, the top north with her early life and the entire middle tier with the early life and miracles of Christ. The bottom tier on both sides is concerned with the Passion of Christ. He is depicted mainly in profile, and his eyes point continuously to the right, perhaps to guide the viewer onwards in the episodes. The kiss of Judas near the end of the sequence signals the close of this left-to-right procession. Below the narrative scenes in colour, Giotto also painted allegorical figures of the seven virtues and their counterparts in monochrome grey (grisaille) to look like marble statues. The central allegories of Justice and Injustice oppose two specific types of government: peace leading to a festival of love and tyranny resulting in wartime rape. Between the narrative scenes are quatrefoil paintings of Old Testament scenes, like Jonah and the Whale, that allegorically correspond to and perhaps foretell the life of Christ.

Much of the blue in the frescoes has been worn away by time. The expense of the ultramarine blue pigment used required it to be painted on top of the already-dry fresco (a secco) to preserve its brilliance. That is why it has disintegrated faster than the other colours, which were painted on wet plaster and have bonded with the wall. An example of the decay can clearly be seen on the robe of the Virgin, in the fresco of the Nativity.

=== Style ===
Giotto's style drew on the solid and classicizing sculpture of Arnolfo di Cambio. Unlike those by Cimabue and Duccio, Giotto's figures are not stylized or elongated and do not follow Byzantine models. They are solidly three-dimensional, have faces and gestures that are based on close observation, and are clothed, not in swirling formalized drapery, but in garments that hang naturally and have form and weight. He also took bold steps in foreshortening and having characters face inwards, with their backs towards the observer, creating the illusion of space. The figures occupy compressed settings with naturalistic elements, often using forced perspective devices so that they resemble stage sets. This similarity is increased by Giotto's careful arrangement of the figures in such a way that the viewer appears to have a particular place and even an involvement in many of the scenes. That can be seen most markedly in the arrangement of the figures in the Mocking of Christ and Lamentation in which the viewer is bidden by the composition to become mocker in one and mourner in the other.

Lamentation (The Mourning of Christ), Scrovegni Chapel

Giotto's depiction of the human face and emotion sets his work apart from that of his contemporaries. When the disgraced Joachim returns sadly to the hillside, the two young shepherds look sideways at each other. The soldier who drags a baby from its screaming mother in the Massacre of the Innocents does so with his head hunched into his shoulders and a look of shame on his face. The people on the road to Egypt gossip about Mary and Joseph as they go. Of Giotto's realism, the 19th-century English critic John Ruskin said, "He painted the Madonna and St. Joseph and the Christ, yes, by all means... but essentially Mamma, Papa and Baby".

Famous narratives in the series include the Adoration of the Magi, in which a comet-like Star of Bethlehem streaks across the sky. Giotto is thought to have been inspired by the 1301 appearance of Halley's Comet, which led to the 1986 space probe Giotto being named after the artist.

== Mature works ==
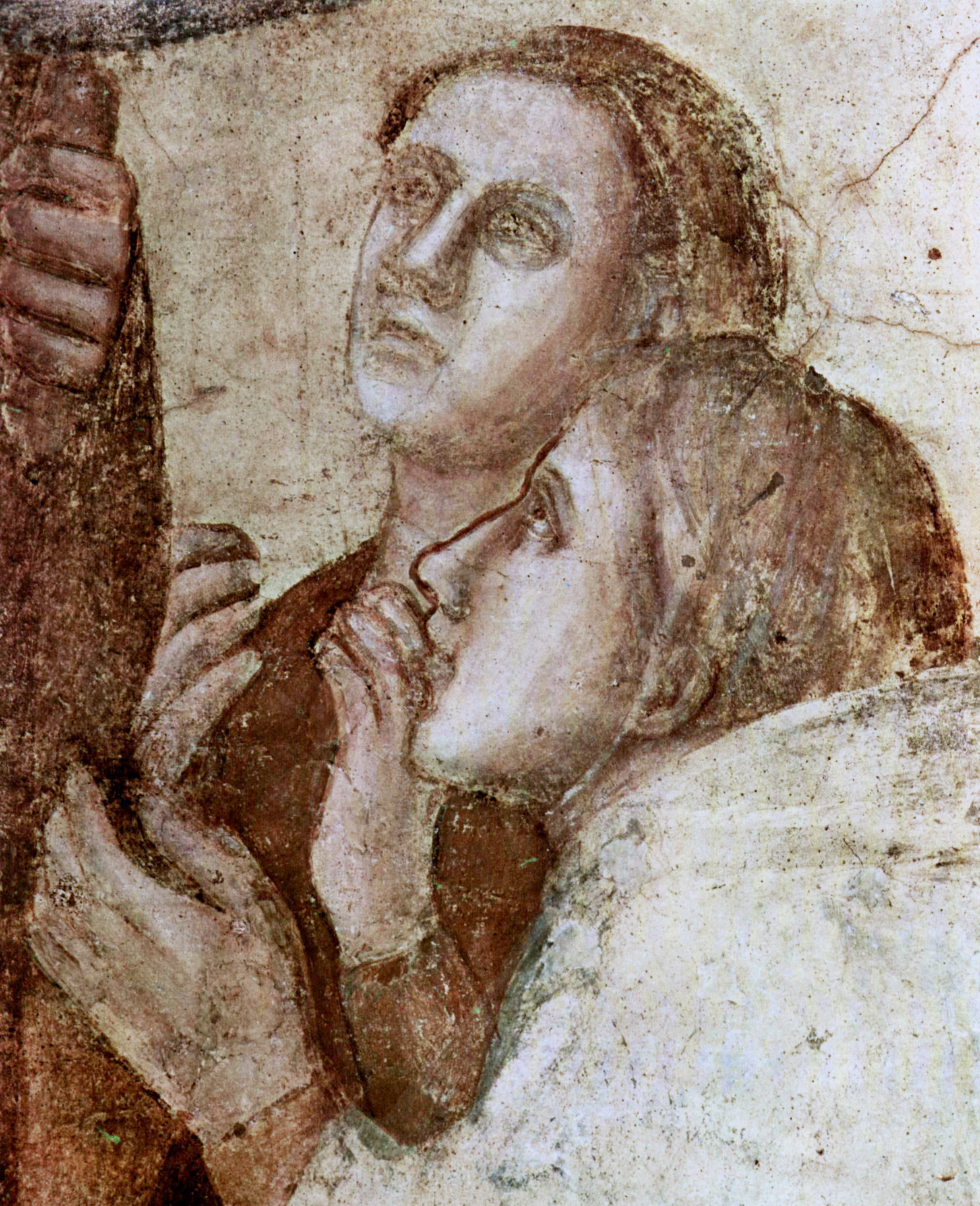
Details of figures from the Raising of Drusiana in the Peruzzi Chapel

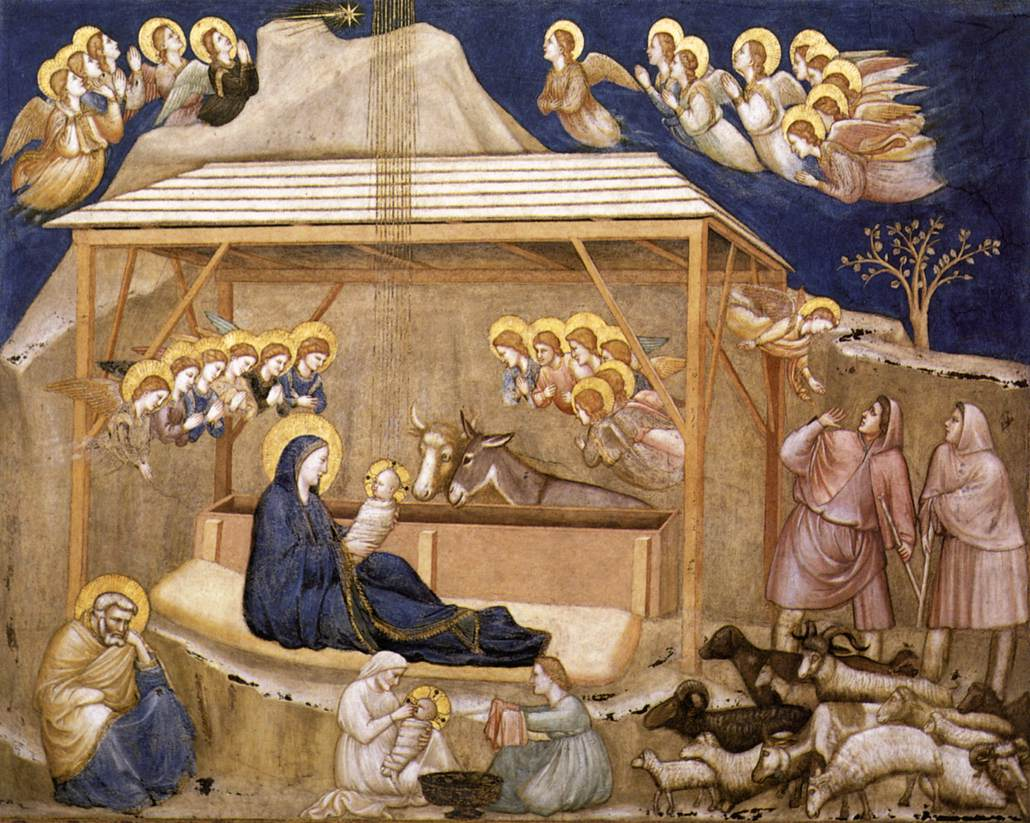
The Nativity in the Lower Church, Assisi

Giotto worked on other frescoes in Padua, some now lost, such as those that were in the Basilica of St. Anthony and the Palazzo della Ragione. Numerous painters from northern Italy were influenced by Giotto's work in Padua, including Guariento, Giusto de' Menabuoi, Jacopo Avanzi, and Altichiero.

From 1306 from 1311 Giotto was in Assisi, where he painted the frescoes in the transept area of the Lower Church of the Basilica of St. Francis, including The Life of Christ, Franciscan Allegories and the Magdalene Chapel, drawing on stories from the Golden Legend and including the portrait of Bishop Teobaldo Pontano, who commissioned the work. Several assistants are mentioned, including Palerino di Guido. The style demonstrates developments from Giotto's work at Padua.

In 1311, Giotto returned to Florence. A document from 1313 about his furniture there shows that he had spent a period in Rome sometime beforehand. It is now thought that he produced the design for the famous Navicella mosaic for the courtyard of the Old St. Peter's Basilica in 1310, commissioned by Cardinal Giacomo or Jacopo Stefaneschi and now lost to the Renaissance church except for some fragments and a Baroque reconstruction. According to the cardinal's necrology, he also at least designed the Stefaneschi Triptych (c. 1320), a double-sided altarpiece for St. Peter's, now in the Vatican Pinacoteca. It shows St. Peter enthroned with saints on the front, and on the reverse, Christ is enthroned, framed with scenes of the martyrdom of Saints Peter and Paul. It is one of the few works by Giotto for which firm evidence of a commission exists. However, the style seems unlikely for either Giotto or his normal Florentine assistants so he may have had his design executed by an ad hoc workshop of Romans.

The cardinal also commissioned Giotto to decorate the apse of St. Peter's Basilica with a cycle of frescoes that were destroyed during the 16th-century renovation. According to Vasari, Giotto remained in Rome for six years, subsequently receiving numerous commissions in Italy, and in the Papal seat at Avignon, but some of the works are now recognized to be by other artists.

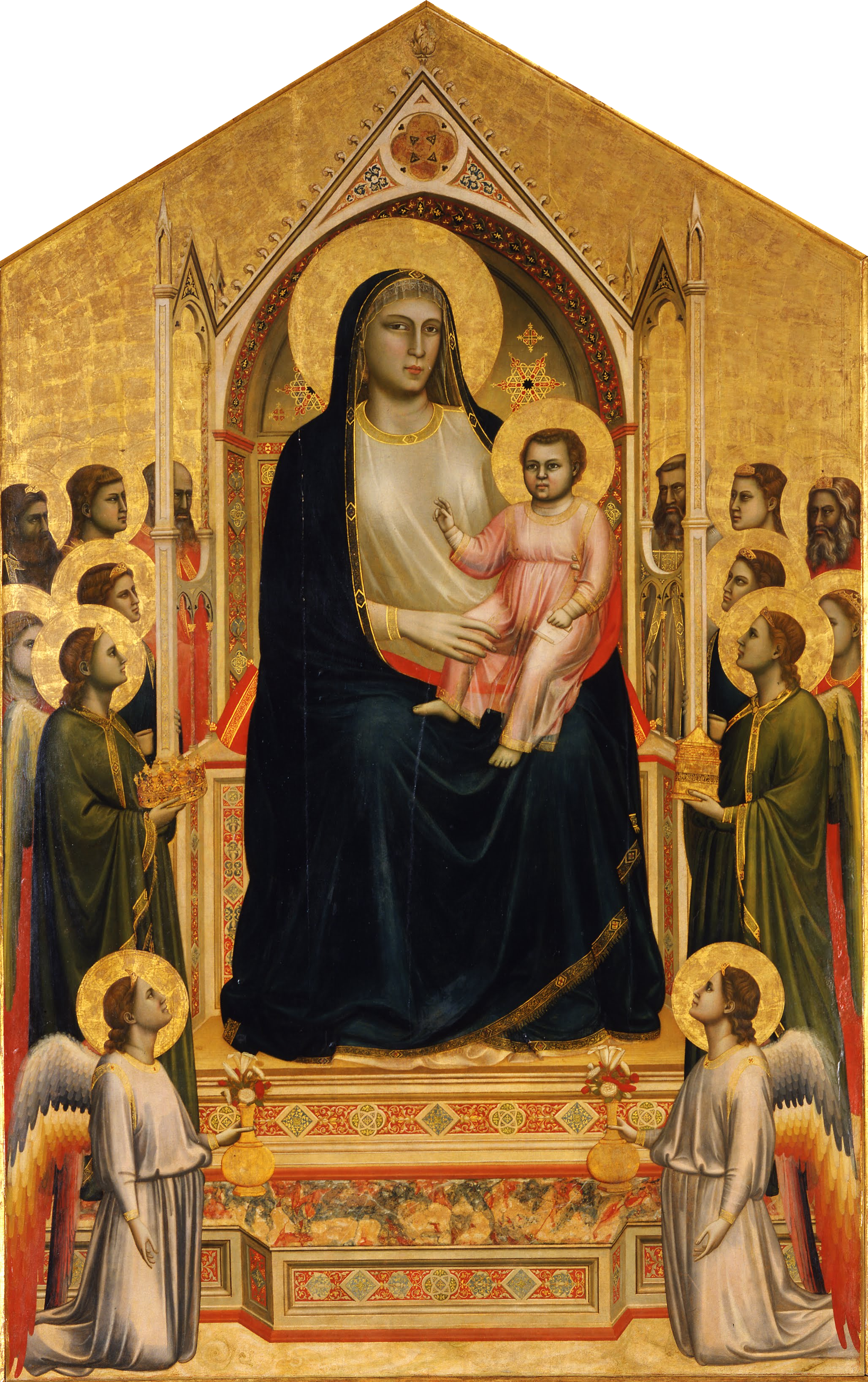
Ognissanti Madonna (c. 1310). Tempera on wood, 325 × 204 cm, Uffizi, Florence

In Florence, where documents from 1314 to 1327 attest to his financial activities, Giotto painted an altarpiece, known as the Ognissanti Madonna, which is now on display in the Uffizi, where it is exhibited beside Cimabue's Santa Trinita Madonna and Duccio's Rucellai Madonna. The Ognissanti altarpiece is the only panel painting by Giotto that has been universally accepted by scholars, despite the fact that it is undocumented. It was painted for the Church of Ognissanti ("all saints") in Florence, which was built by an obscure religious order, known as the Humiliati. It is a large painting, 325 by 204 centimetres (128 in × 80 in), and scholars are divided on whether it was made for the main altar of the church, where it would have been viewed primarily by the brothers of the order, or for the choir screen, where it would have been more easily seen by a lay audience.

He also painted around the time the Dormition of the Virgin, now in the Berlin Gemäldegalerie, and the Crucifix in the Church of Ognissanti.

=== Peruzzi and Bardi Chapels at Santa Croce ===
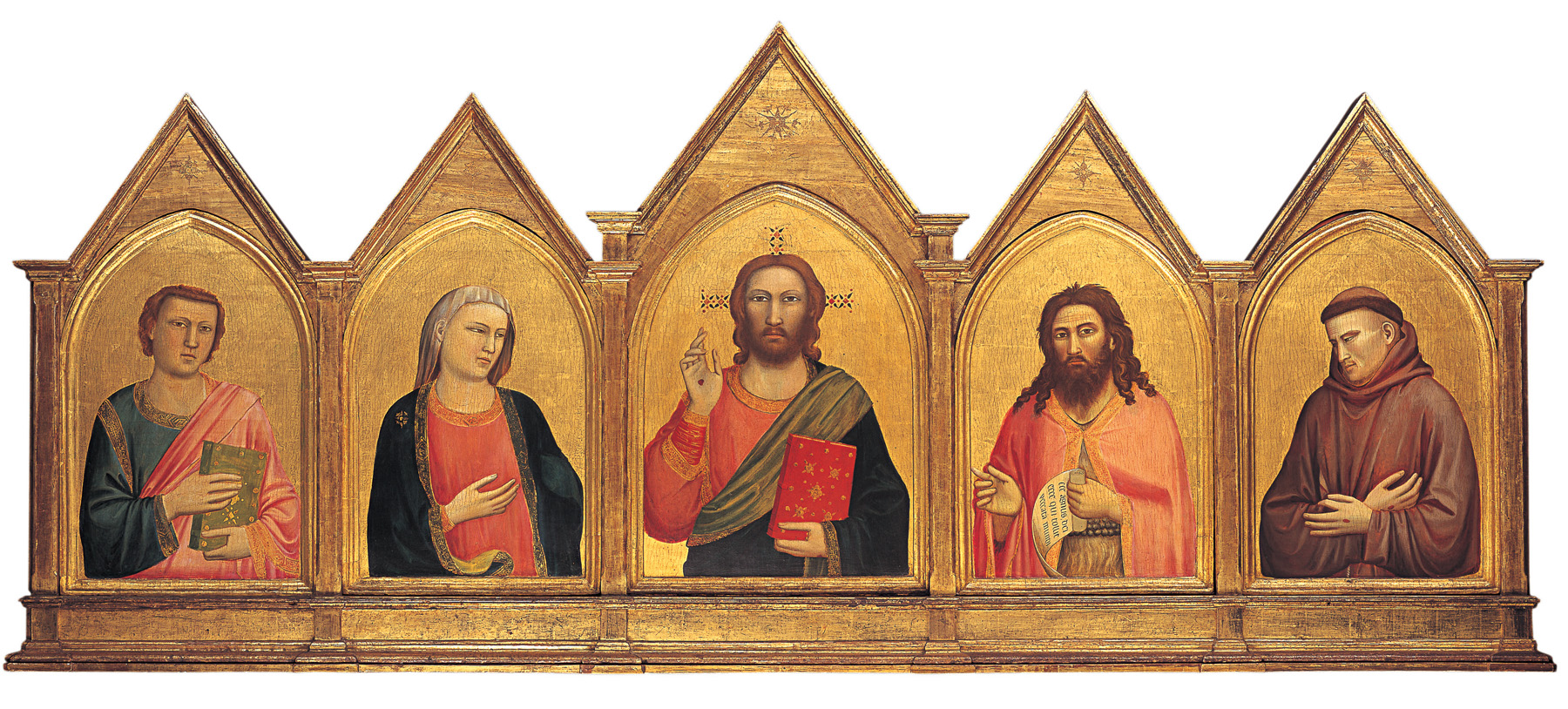
Peruzzi Altarpiece, c. 1322, North Carolina Museum of Art, Raleigh

According to Lorenzo Ghiberti, Giotto painted chapels for four different Florentine families in the church of Santa Croce, but he does not identify which chapels. It is only with Vasari that the four chapels are identified: the Bardi Chapel (Life of St. Francis), the Peruzzi Chapel (Life of St. John the Baptist and St. John the Evangelist, perhaps including a polyptych of Madonna with Saints now in the North Carolina Museum of Art of Raleigh) and the lost Giugni Chapel (Stories of the Apostles) and the Tosinghi Spinelli Chapel (Stories of the Holy Virgin). As with almost everything in Giotto's career, the dates of the fresco decorations that survive in Santa Croce are disputed. The Bardi Chapel, immediately to the right of the main chapel of the church, was painted in true fresco, and to some scholars, the simplicity of its settings seems relatively close to those of Padua, but the Peruzzi Chapel's more complex settings suggest a later date.

The Peruzzi Chapel is adjacent to the Bardi Chapel and was largely painted a secco. The technique, quicker but less durable than a true fresco, has left the work in a seriously-deteriorated condition. Scholars who date the cycle earlier in Giotto's career see the growing interest in architectural expansion that it displays as close to the developments of the giottesque frescoes in the Lower Church at Assisi, but the Bardi frescoes have a new softness of colour that indicates the artist going in a different direction, probably under the influence of Sienese art so it must be later.

The Peruzzi Chapel pairs three frescoes from the life of St. John the Baptist (The Annunciation of John's Birth to his Father Zacharias; The Birth and Naming of John; The Feast of Herod) on the left wall with three scenes from the life of St. John the Evangelist (The Visions of John on Ephesus; The Raising of Drusiana; The Ascension of John) on the right wall. The choice of scenes has been related to both the patrons and the Franciscans. Because of the deteriorated condition of the frescoes, it is difficult to discuss Giotto's style in the chapel, but the frescoes show signs of his typical interest in controlled naturalism and psychological penetration. The Peruzzi Chapel was especially renowned during Renaissance times. Giotto's compositions influenced Masaccio's frescoes at the Brancacci Chapel, and Michelangelo is also known to have studied them.

The Bardi Chapel depicts the life of Francis of Assisi, following a similar iconography to the frescoes in the Upper Church at Assisi, dating from 20 to 30 years earlier. A comparison shows the greater attention given by Giotto to expression in the human figures and the simpler, better-integrated architectural forms. Giotto represents only seven scenes from the saint's life, and the narrative is arranged somewhat unusually. The story starts on the upper left wall with St. Francis Renounces his Father. It continues across the chapel to the upper right wall with the Approval of the Franciscan Rule, moves down the right wall to the Trial by Fire, across the chapel again to the left wall for the Appearance at Arles, down the left wall to the Death of St. Francis, and across once more to the posthumous Visions of Fra Agostino and the Bishop of Assisi. The Stigmatization of St. Francis, which chronologically belongs between the Appearance at Arles and the Death, is located outside the chapel, above the entrance arch. The arrangement encourages viewers to link scenes together: to pair frescoes across the chapel space or relate triads of frescoes along each wall. The linkings suggest meaningful symbolic relationships between different events in St. Francis's life.

== Later works and death ==
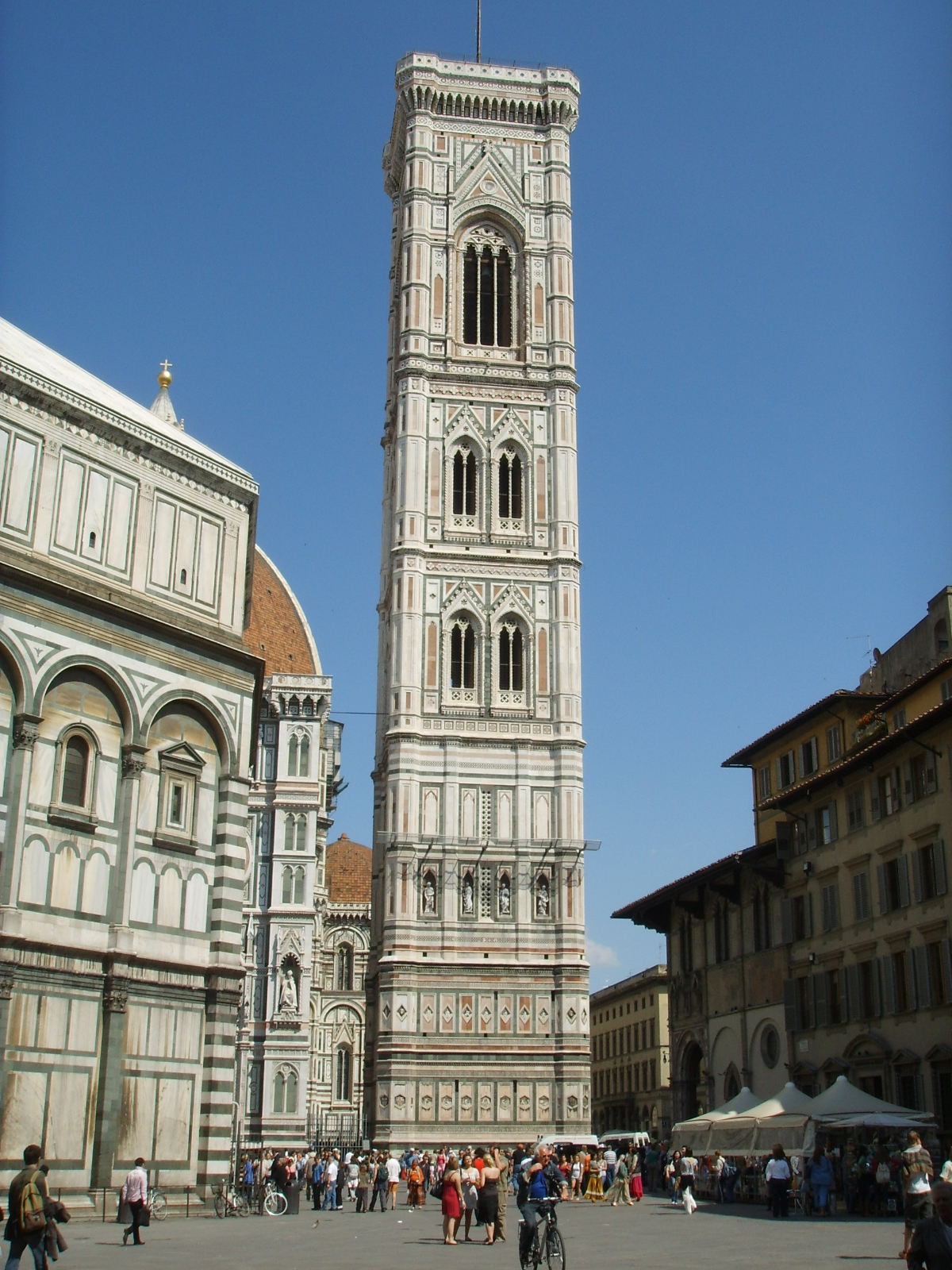
Giotto's Campanile, Florence

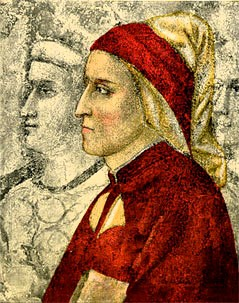
Engraving after a portrait of Dante by Giotto

In 1328, the altarpiece of the Baroncelli Chapel, Santa Croce, Florence, was completed. Previously ascribed to Giotto, it is now believed to be mostly a work by assistants, including Taddeo Gaddi, who later frescoed the chapel. The next year, Giotto was called by King Robert of Anjou to Naples where he remained with a group of pupils until 1333. Few of Giotto's Neapolitan works have survived: a fragment of a fresco portraying the Lamentation of Christ in the church of Santa Chiara and the Illustrious Men that is painted on the windows of the Santa Barbara Chapel of Castel Nuovo, which are usually attributed to his pupils. In 1332, King Robert named him "first court painter", with a yearly pension. Also in this time period, according to Vasari, Giotto composed a series on the Bible; scenes from the Book of Revelation were based on ideas by Dante.

After Naples, Giotto stayed for a while in Bologna, where he painted a polyptych for the church of Santa Maria degli Angeli and, according to some sources, a lost decoration for the Chapel in the Cardinal Legate's Castle. In 1334, Giotto was appointed chief architect to Florence Cathedral. He designed the bell tower, known as Giotto's Campanile, begun on July 18, 1334. After Giotto's death three years later, Andrea Pisano and finally Francesco Talenti took over the tower's construction, completed in 1359 and not entirely to Giotto's design. Before 1337, he was in Milan with Azzone Visconti, but no trace of works by him remains in the city. His last known work was with assistants' help: the decoration of Podestà Chapel in the Bargello, Florence.

Giotto appears in the writings of many contemporary authors, including Boccaccio, Dante and Franco Sacchetti. Sacchetti recounted the likely fictional incident in which a civilian commissioned Giotto to paint a shield with his coat of arms; Giotto instead painted the shield "armed to the teeth", complete with a sword, lance, dagger, and suit of armor. He told the man to "Go into the world a little, before you talk of arms as if you were the Duke of Bavaria", and in response was sued. Giotto countersued and won two florins. In The Divine Comedy, Dante acknowledged the greatness of his living contemporary by the words of a painter in Purgatorio (XI, 94–96): "Cimabue believed that he held the field/In painting, and now Giotto has the cry,/ So the fame of the former is obscure." Giotto died in January 1337.

== Burial and legacy ==
According to Vasari, Giotto was buried in the Cathedral of Florence, on the left of the entrance and with the spot marked by a white marble plaque. According to other sources, he was buried in the Church of Santa Reparata. The apparently-contradictory reports are explained by the fact that the remains of Santa Reparata are directly beneath the Cathedral and the church continued in use while the construction of the cathedral proceeded in the early 14th century.

During an excavation in the 1970s, bones were discovered beneath the paving of Santa Reparata at a spot close to the location given by Vasari but unmarked on either level. Forensic examination of the bones by anthropologist Francesco Mallegni and a team of experts in 2000 brought to light some evidence that seemed to confirm that they were those of a painter (particularly the range of chemicals, including arsenic and lead, both commonly found in paint, which the bones had absorbed). The bones were those of a very short man, a little over four feet tall, who may have suffered from a form of congenital dwarfism. That supports a tradition at the Church of Santa Croce that a dwarf who appears in one of the frescoes is a self-portrait of Giotto. On the other hand, a man wearing a white hat who appears in the Last Judgement at Padua is also said to be a portrait of Giotto. The appearance of this man conflicts with the image in Santa Croce, in regards to stature.

Forensic reconstruction of the skeleton at Santa Reperata showed a short man with a very large head, a large hooked nose and one eye more prominent than the other. The bones of the neck indicated that the man spent a lot of time with his head tilted backwards. The front teeth were worn in a way consistent with frequently holding a brush between the teeth. The man was about 70 at the time of death. While the Italian researchers were convinced that the body belonged to Giotto and it was reburied with honour near the grave of Filippo Brunelleschi, others have been highly sceptical. Franklin Toker, a professor of art history at the University of Pittsburgh, who was present at the original excavation in 1970, says that they are probably "the bones of some fat butcher".
