= Lamentation (The Mourning of Christ) =

Painting by Giotto

- Artist: Giotto di Bondone
- Year: c. 1304–1306
- Medium: fresco
- Dimensions: 200 by 185 centimetres (79 in × 73 in)
- Location: Scrovegni Chapel, Padua, Italy

Lamentation (The Mourning of Christ) is a fresco painted c.1305 by the Italian artist Giotto as part of his cycle of the Life of Christ on the interior walls of the Scrovegni Chapel in Padua, Italy.

The Scrovegni Chapel was built as a private chapel next to the Eremitani Monastery by the wealthy Scrovegni family and consecrated in 1305. Between 1304 and 1306, Giotto decorated the interior walls of the chapel with a series of frescoes depicting scenes from the Life of Jesus. The upper sections of the walls also include stories of Joachim and Anna, parents of the Virgin Mary. The works are considered a masterpiece. Both the monastery and the chapel now form part of the Musei Civici di Padova.

Giotto is described as a Proto-Renaissance artist, preceding and paving the way for the early Florentine Renaissance painters, breaking the artistic mold of the Byzantine period by introducing naturalism and depth into his work.

In the painting, the body of the crucified Christ has been lowered from the cross and laid on the ground, surrounded by his grieving mother and disciples. His head is held by Mary, his mother, and his feet by Mary Magdelene. John the Apostle throws his arms wide in despair. To the right, Nicodemus and Joseph of Arimathea wait to prepare the body to be laid in a tomb. (John 19:38–42)

== See also ==
- 100 Great Paintings, 1980 BBC series
- Lamentation of Christ
