= Laments for Josiah =

Laments for Josiah is the term used in reference to 2 Chronicles 35:25. The passage reads: "And Jeremiah lamented for Josiah: and all the singing men and the singing women spake of Josiah in their lamentations to this day, and made them an ordinance in Israel: and, behold, they are written in the lamentations."

This source, as described by the Chronicler, should not be confused with the canonical Book of Lamentations. The same event is retold in 1 Esdras 1:32, although it lacks any reference to writing, or the recording of the lamentation. Nevertheless, the dirges referred to in 2 Chronicles and 1 Esdras, as well as Lamentations may refer to a larger corpus of laments that once existed in the temple or palace archives of ancient Jerusalem.

== See also ==
- Table of books of Judeo-Christian Scripture
