= Lamentation (Pietà) =

Painting from the circle of Petrus Christus

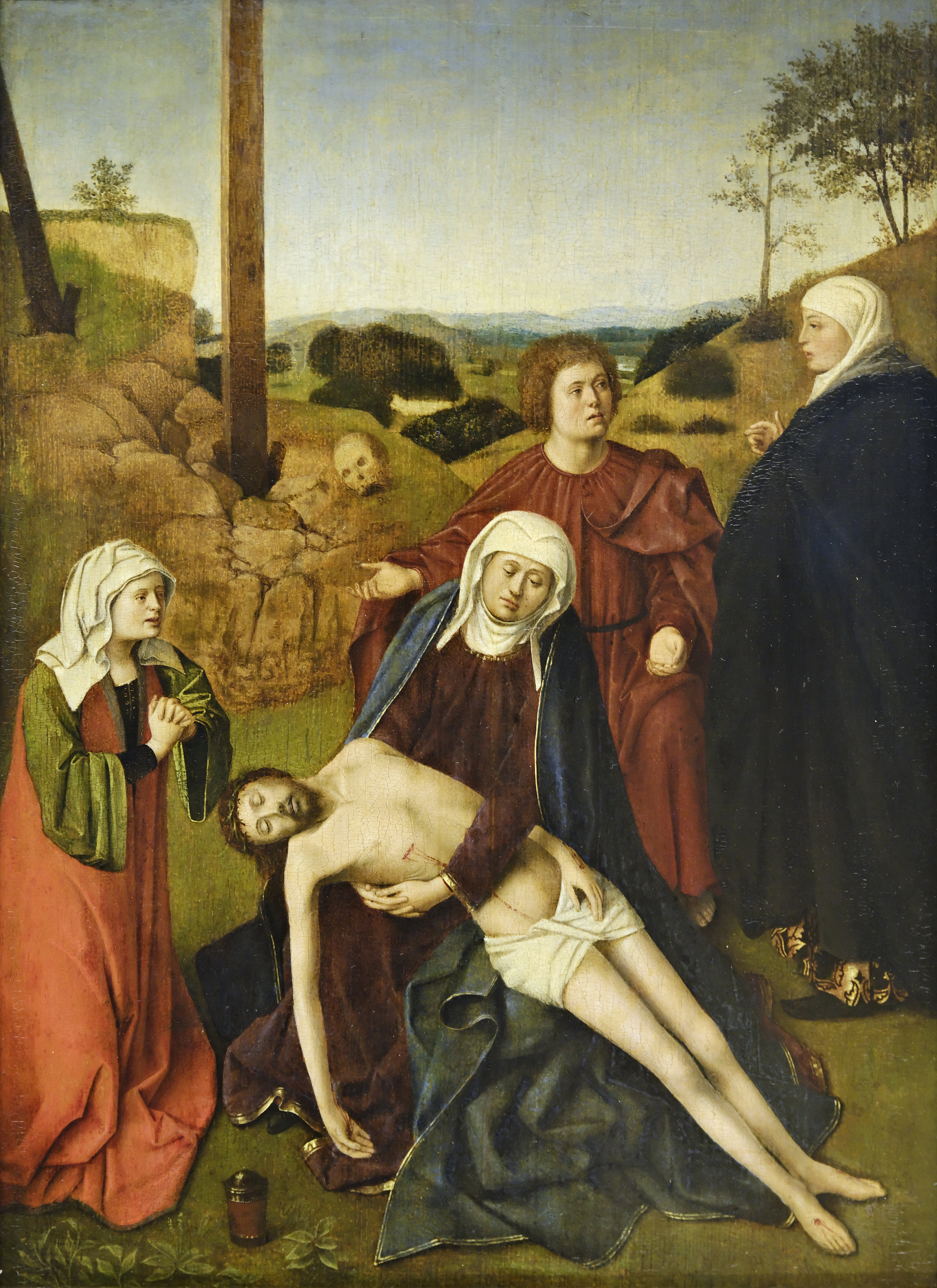
- Artist: Petrus Christus
- Year: c. 1444 (1435–1450)
- Type: Oil on panel
- Dimensions: 380 cm × 305 cm (150 in × 120 in)
- Location: Louvre, Paris

Lamentation (Pietà) (also Lamentation Over The Dead Christ) is an oil painting on panel of the common subject of the Lamentation of Christ that is now regarded as by an artist in the "circle" of the Early Netherlandish painter Petrus Christus, rather than by Christus himself. It was painted c. 1444, and is now in the Louvre in Paris.

== History ==
Bought by the Louvre in 1951 from the Schloss Fuschl Collection for 5,000,000 francs, this work of the Flemish artist belongs to a groups of paintings in which the Italian influence is clearly visible: see for instance, the Entombment, the Nativity, the Death of the Virgin, and the Portrait of a Man.

Petrus Christus, working at Bruges, continued to paint in the style of Jan van Eyck at a time when most Flemish artists had abandoned this manner in favour of Rogier van der Weyden's more dramatic character. He seems to have visited Italy some time between 1454 and 1462. Various factors suggest that he may have travelled as far as the south of Italy: Antonello da Messina's influence on him, for example, together with the presence of paintings from his hand in Sicily as early as the 16th century, and certain affinities between his work and that of the School of Naples. He may have contributed to the introduction of the Flemish technique of painting into Italy.

The artist's early manner was dry and awkward, with a tendency towards archaism, but under the beneficial influence of Antonello his work gained in suppleness, revealing a new sense of harmony and rhythm in the compositions, a monumental conception of the figures, and a certain proud dignity of facial expression. The Louvre painting has all these characteristics: the landscape is painted in broad planes, and the diagonal arrangement of the heads and the delicate arabesque on Christ's body contribute to the composition's subtlety. The Virgin's head is a perfect oval, in the manner of Antonello da Messina; St. John's square-cut face, with his determined jaw, recalls that artist's portraits, and the woman's head seen in profile (very rare in the work of Flemish artists) is also reminiscent of certain heads by Italian painters.
