= Lamentation of Christ (Matsys) =

Triptych by Quentin Massys

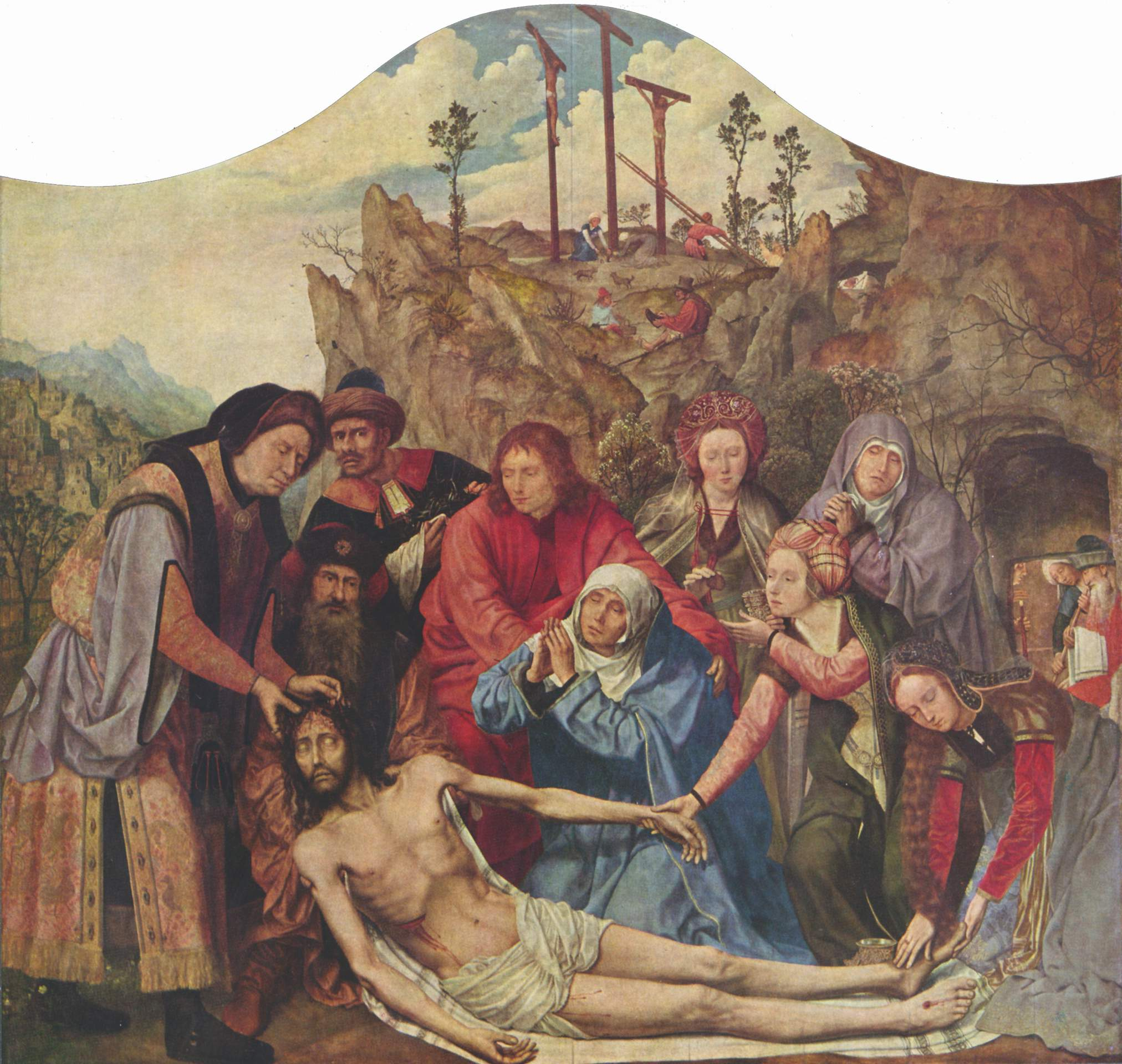
- Artist: Quentin Matsys
- Year: 1511
- Location: Antwerp Cathedral; Antwerp

Lamentation of Christ is a 1511 painting created by the Flemish artist Quentin Matsys for the carpenters' guild in Antwerp Cathedral, where it still hangs.

The work is a triptych, with a central panel showing the Lamentation and side panels show the martyrdom of John the Evangelist and Salome presenting John the Baptist's head to Herod - the two Johns are the two patron saints of carpenters.
