= Raphel =

Raphel may refer to:

- Arnold Lewis Raphel (1943–1988), the 18th U.S. ambassador in Pakistan
- Monique Raphel High, American author
- Raphel Cherry (born 1961), former American football defensive back in the National Football League
- Raphel Ortiz Huertas, Puerto Rican professional soccer player
- Robin Raphel, career diplomat, Ambassador to Tunisia and Assistant Secretary of State for South Asian Affairs during the Clinton administration

== See also ==
- Raphèl maí amèche zabí almi
