= List of legends in the Quran =

Several parables or pieces of narrative appear in the Quran, often with similar motifs to Jewish and Christian traditions which may predate those in the Quran.

Some included legends are the story of Cain and Abel (sura al-Ma'idah 27–31), of Abraham destroying idols (sura al-Anbiya 57), of Solomon's conversation with an ant (sura an-Naml), the story of the Seven Sleepers, and several stories about Mary, mother of Jesus. Parallel narratives include the stories of Abraham and the Idol Shop (Genesis Rabbah, 38) and Valley of the ants.

Folklorist Alan Dundes has noted three "folktales" in the Quran that fit the pattern of those included in the Aarne–Thompson–Uther Index of folklore narratives. Peter G. Bietenholz has also noted legends in the Quran that share themes found in Jewish and Christian legends.

== Dispute over origins ==
The Quran mentions accusations by non-believer contemporaries of Muhammad that many stories in the Quran are fables:

Those who disbelieve say: "This (Quran) is but a fabrication which he (Muhammad) himself has invented, and some others have helped him with it, so they have produced a wrong and a falsehood." They also say: "(It consists of) only fables of the ancients which he has got written. They are being read to him in early mornings and evenings (while people are at home)." Say: "(It is a Book full of knowledge revealing many secrets such as no human being could in any wise discover by himself) He Who knows all the secrets contained in the heavens and the earth sends it down (to teach you some of these secrets and guide you in your life so that you may attain happiness in both worlds). He surely is All-Forgiving, All-Compassionate." (Q.25:4-6)

Muslims (such as Muhittin Akgul writing in Islamicity) do not deny that some stories found in the Quran are from "ancient nations", but insist they are not mythology but "factual", and were not taught to Muhammad by Jews or Christians in his region, but revealed by God and provided to humanity as guidance and "deterrents".

== Jewish legends ==
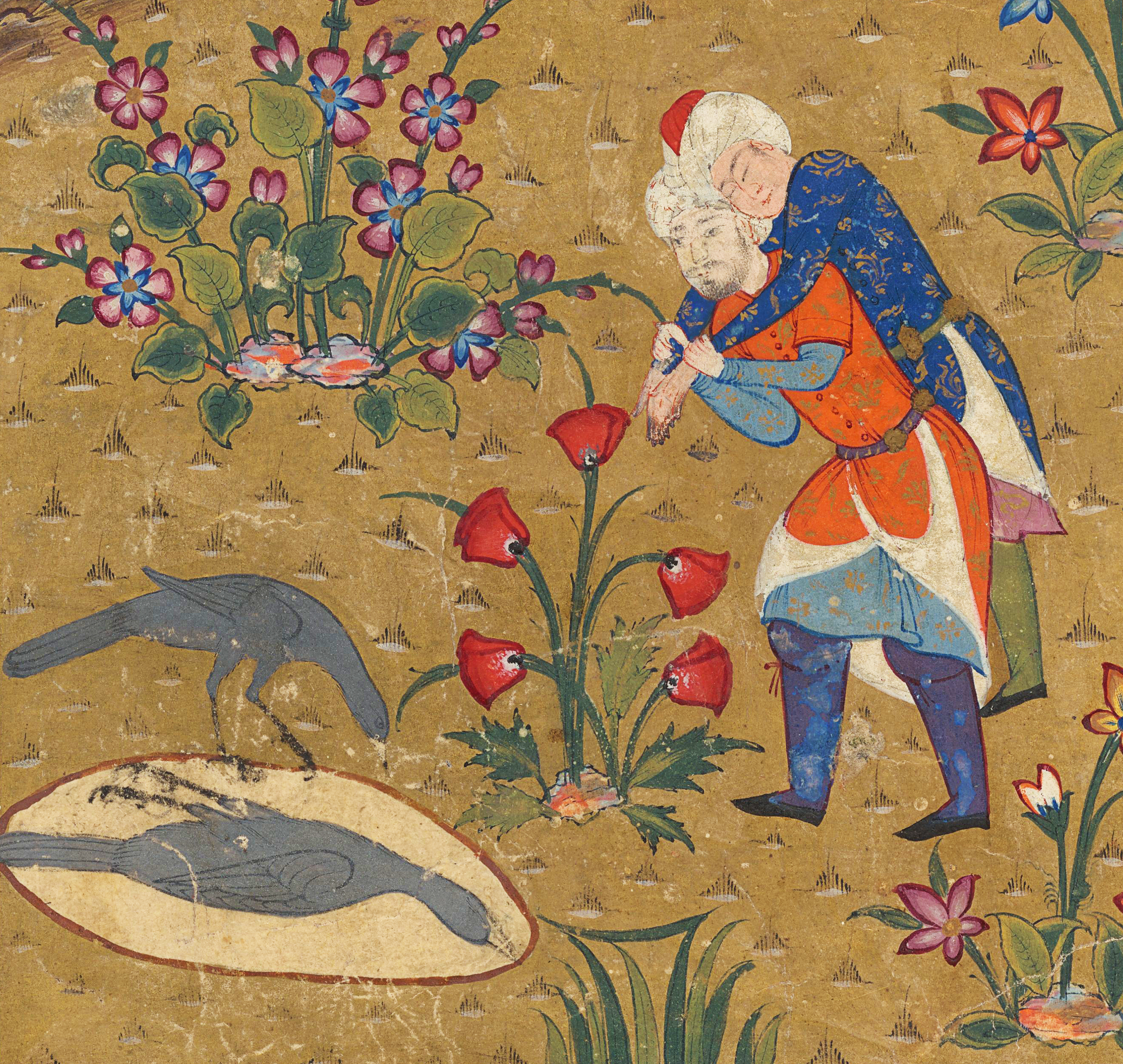
Qabil watching a crow sent from God. It teaches him to bury Habil's murdered body, in order to hide his shame.

=== Cain and Abel ===
Some narratives appear to reflect Jewish Tanhuma legends, like the narrative of Cain learning to bury the body of Abel in Sura al-Ma'ida (5:31). Surah 5:32, when discussing the legal and moral applications to the story of Cain and Abel, is similar to what is found in the Tanhuma tradition.

Whoever destroys a soul, it is considered as if he destroyed an entire world. And whoever saves a life, it is considered as if he saved an entire world.

— Jerusalem Talmud, Sanhedrin 4:1 (22a)

Because of that We ordained for the Children of Israel: that whoever kills a person—unless it is for murder or corruption on earth—it is as if he killed the whole of mankind; and whoever saves it, it is as if he saved the whole of mankind. Our messengers came to them with clarifications, but even after that, many of them continue to commit excesses in the land.

— Quran 5:32

=== Abraham destroys the idols ===
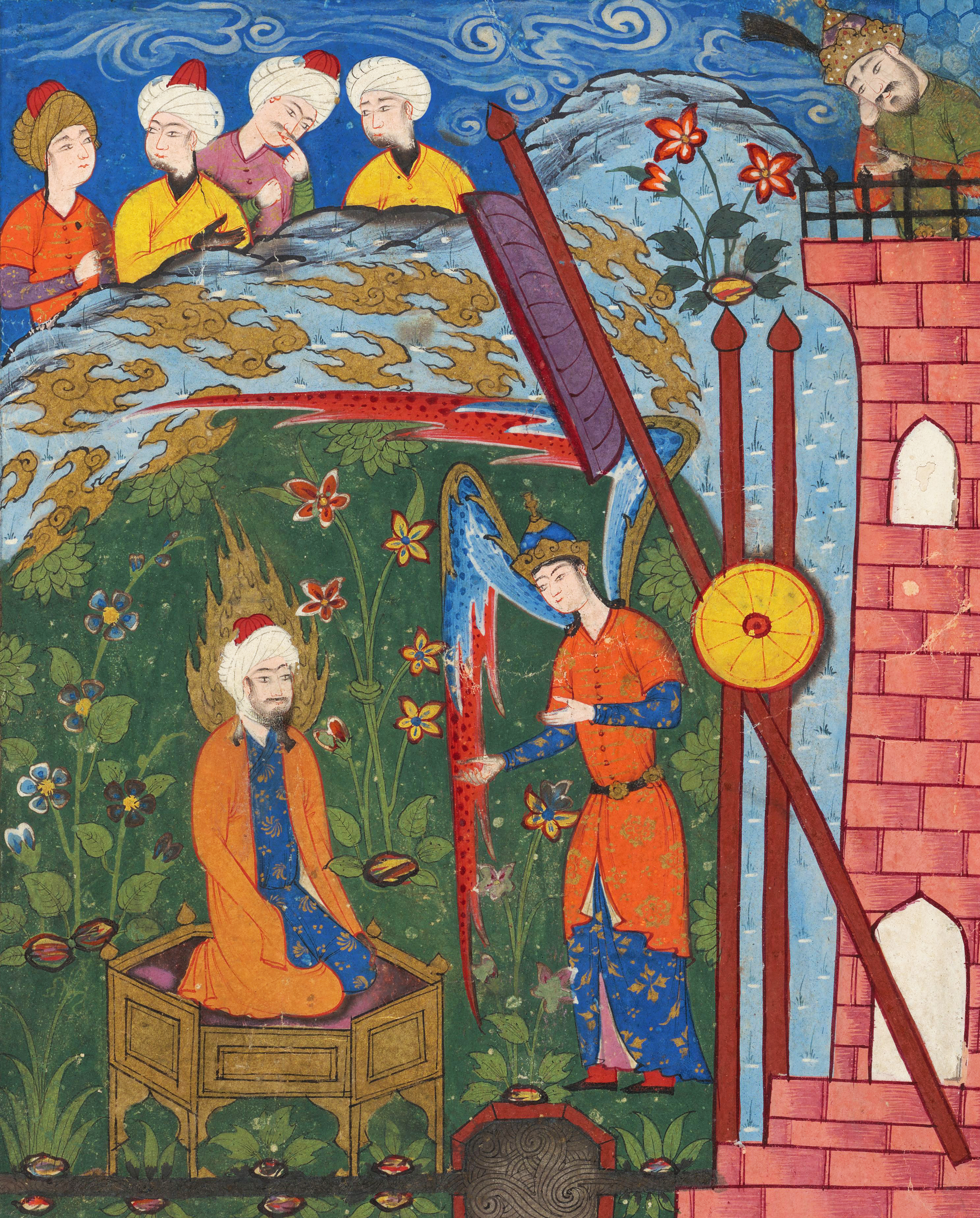
Ibrahim protected from Nimrod's fire.

Al-Anbiya, which tells of Abraham destroying the idols, after which he is delivered by God from being thrown into the fire, parallels a legend found in the Midrash Rabbah.

=== Solomon and the Valley of the Ants ===
Both the Quran and the text Legends of the Jews feature the story of Solomon and the Valley of the Ants:

On one occasion he strayed into the valley of the ants in the course of his wanderings. He heard one ant order all the others to withdraw, to avoid being crushed by the armies of Solomon. The king halted and summoned the ant that had spoken. She told him that she was the queen of the ants, and she gave her reasons for the order of withdrawal. Solomon wanted to put a question to the ant queen, but she refused to answer unless the king took her up and placed her on his hand. He acquiesced, and then he put his question: 'Is there any one greater than I am in all the world?' 'Yes,' said the ant. Solomon: 'Who?' Ant: 'I am.' Solomon: 'How is that possible?' Ant: 'Were I not greater than thou, God would not have led thee hither to put me on thy hand.' Exasperated, Solomon threw her to the ground, and said: 'Thou knowest who I am? I am Solomon, the son of David.' Not at all intimidated, the ant reminded the king of his earthly origin, and admonished him to humility, and the king went off abashed.

— Legends of the Jews 5

On another day while sailing over a valley where there were many swarms of ants, Solomon heard one ant say to the others, 'Enter your houses; otherwise Solomon's legions will destroy you.' The king asked why she spoke thus, and she answered that she was afraid [that] if the ants looked at Solomon's legions they might be turned from their duty of praising God, which would be disastrous to them. She added that, being the queen of the ants, she had in that capacity given them the order to retire. Solomon desired to ask her a question; but she told him that it was not becoming for the interrogator to be above and the interrogated below. Solomon thereupon brought her up out of the valley; but she then said it was not fitting that he should sit on a throne while she remained on the ground. Solomon now placed her upon his hand, and asked her whether there was any one in the world greater than he. The ant replied that she was much greater; otherwise God would not have sent him there to place her upon his hand. The king, greatly angered, threw her down, saying, 'Dost thou know who I am? I am Solomon, the son of David!' She answered: 'I know that thou art created of a corrupted drop [compare Ab. iii. 1]; therefore thou oughtest not to be proud.' Solomon was filled with shame, and fell on his face.

— Jellinek 150:22

Until, when they came upon the Valley of Ants, an ant said, 'O ants! Go into your nests, lest Sulaimān (Solomon) and his troops crush you without noticing.' He smiled and laughed at her words, and said, 'My Lord, direct me to be thankful for the blessings you have bestowed upon me and upon my parents, and to do good works that please You. And admit me, by Your grace, into the company of Your virtuous servants.'

— Quran 27:18–19

However, the Jewish text of the Beth ha-Midrash by Adolf Jellinek (simply referred to as "Jellinek") was written between 1853 and 1878, about 1,200 years after the Quran. Of all the midrashim associated with Solomon, the episode of the Ant is most directly influenced by the Islamic traditions. While the King's connection to this small insect might derive from the Tanakh (e.g. Proverbs 6:6), the stories told in this narrative seem predominantly, if not exclusively, to come from a Muslim context: Solomon's dominion over demons, control of the wind, reliance upon Asaph the Jew, and confederacy with the vulture are all well-attested themes in the Quran and subsequent traditions, yet barely discoverable in a Jewish context. However, these borrowings from Islamic culture ultimately are framed in a very Jewish fashion.

== Christian legends ==
The Quran also contains many references to Apocryphal Christian legends.

=== The Seven Sleepers ===
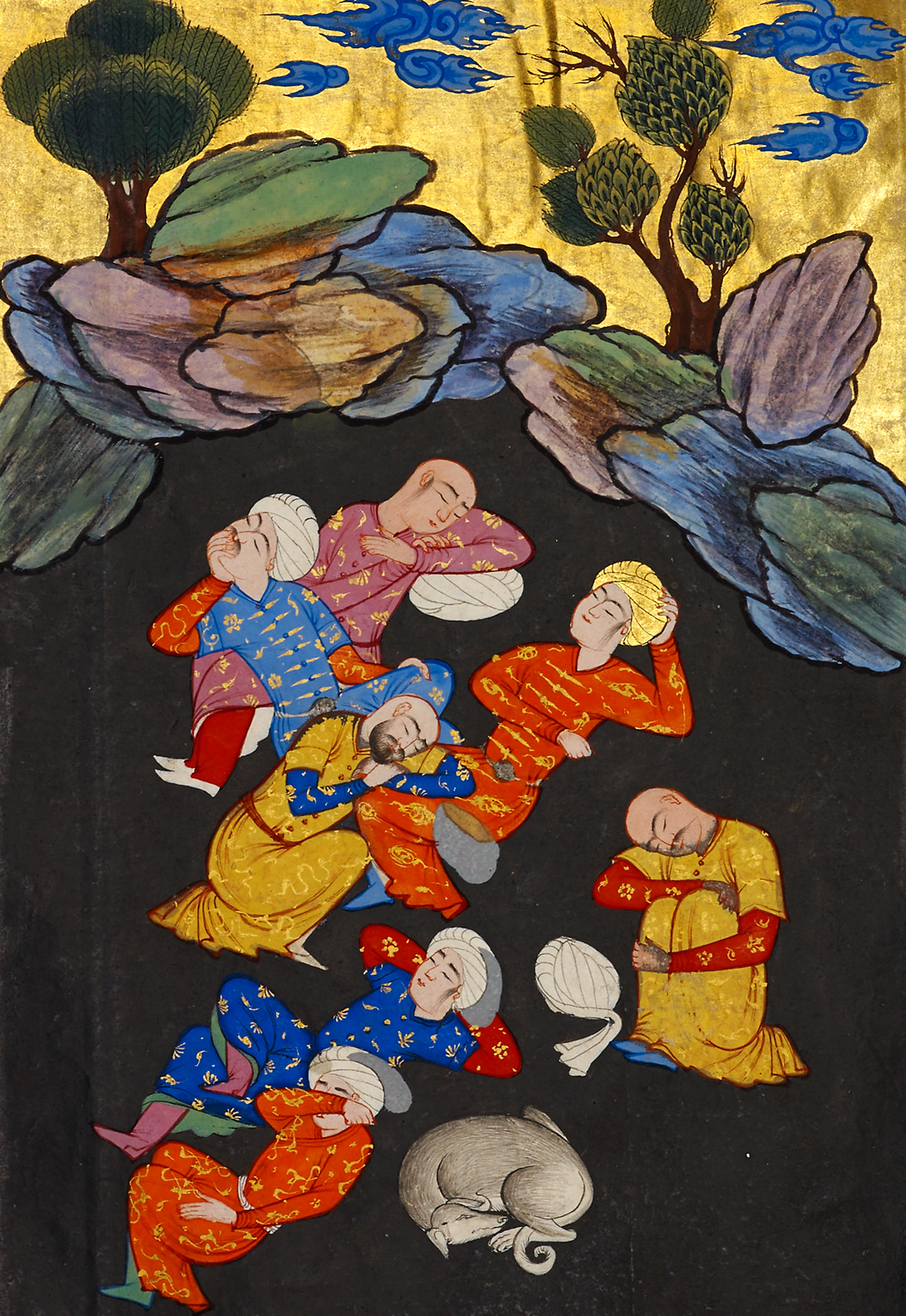
Islamic depiction of the Sleepers.

In the Seven Sleepers legend, seven believers from Ephesus seek refuge in a cave from pagans threatening them with death and fall into a miraculous sleep lasting hundreds of years. They awake to find the pagans vanquished and the land converted to their faith. The story fits Aarne-Thompson story type 766.

The earliest version of this story comes from the Syrian bishop Jacob of Serugh (c. 450–521), which is itself derived from an earlier Greek source, now lost. An outline of this tale appears in Gregory of Tours (538–594), and in Paul the Deacon's (720–799) History of the Lombards. The best-known Western version of the story appears in Jacobus de Voragine's Golden Legend.

Christians celebrate the "Seven Sleepers of Ephesus" as a miracle and for centuries the Roman church celebrated its feast day on 27 July.

The Seven Sleepers legend also appears in the Quran (Quran 18:9–25), where the sleepers are described as Muslims, and the length of their sleep is given specifically as 309 years; but the threat of death from pagans, the location of the cave, and even the exact number of sleepers are not mentioned.

=== Mary ===
==== Mary was named by her mother ====
Both the apocryphal Gospel of James and the Quran feature the legend of the naming of Mary:

In the records of the twelve tribes of Israel was Joachim [...] And his wife Anna [...] And the days having been fulfilled, Anna was purified, and gave the breast to the child, and called her name Mary.

— Gospel of James 1,2,5

The wife of Imran said, 'My Lord, I have vowed to You what is in my womb, dedicated, so accept from me; You are the Hearer and Knower.' And when she delivered her, she said, 'My Lord, I have delivered a female,' and God was well aware of what she has delivered, 'and the male is not like the female, and I have named her Mary,...'

— Quran 3:35–36

==== Mary's miraculous nourishment ====
Both the apocryphal Gospel of James and the Quran feature the story of Mary being fed in the Second Temple by an angel of the Lord:

And Mary was in the Temple of the Lord. She was nurtured like a dove, and received food from the hand of an angel.

— Gospel of James 8

Whenever Zechariah entered upon her in the sanctuary, he found her with provision. He said, 'O Mary, where did you get this from?' She said, 'It is from God; God provides to whom He wills without reckoning.'

— Quran 3:37

==== The selection of Mary's guardian by lottery ====
Both the apocryphal Gospel of James and the Quran feature the story of the selection of Mary's guardian:

...Joseph took his rod last; and, behold, a dove came out of the rod, and flew upon Joseph's head. And the priest said to Joseph, You have been chosen by lot to take into your keeping the virgin of the Lord.

— Gospel of James 9

Then her Lord accepted her graciously and blessed her with a pleasant upbringing and placed her in the care of Zechariah [...]

— Quran 3:37

These are accounts from the Unseen, which We reveal to you. You were not with them when they cast their lots as to which of them would take charge of Mary; nor were you with them as they quarreled.

— Quran 3:44

==== Eating from a palm tree ====
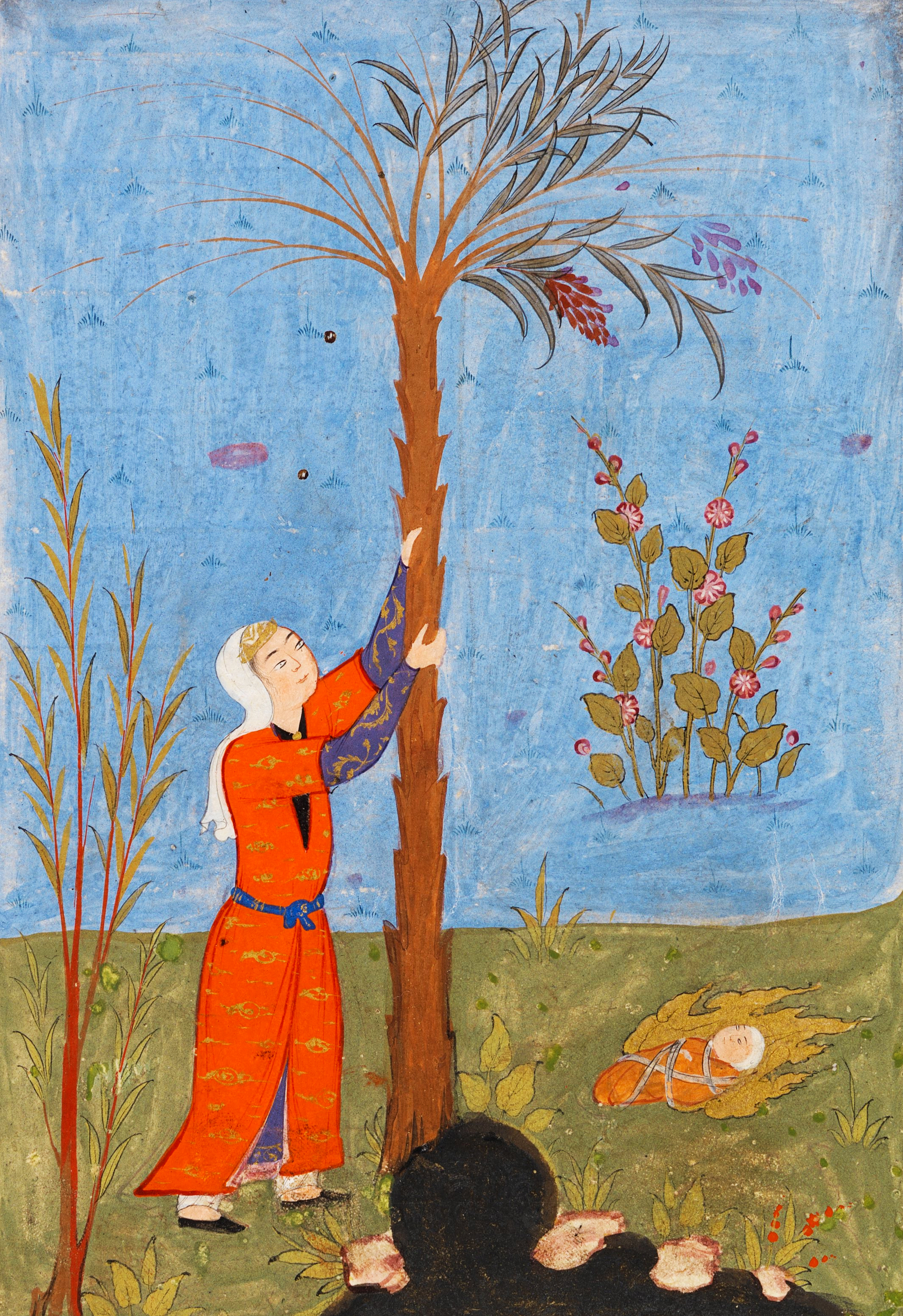
Mary shaking the palm tree for dates, a legend derived from the Qur'an.

The Gospel of Pseudo-Matthew and the Quran both feature the story of Mary eating from a palm tree:

And it came to pass on the third day of their journey, while they were walking, that the blessed Mary was fatigued by the excessive heat of the sun in the desert; and seeing a palm tree, she said to Joseph: Let me rest a little under the shade of this tree...Then the child Jesus, with a joyful countenance, reposing in the bosom of His mother, said to the palm: O tree, bend your branches, and refresh my mother with your fruit. And immediately at these words the palm bent its top down to the very feet of the blessed Mary; and they gathered from it fruit, with which they were all refreshed.

— Gospel of Pseudo-Matthew 20

So she carried him, and secluded herself with him in a remote place. The labor-pains came upon her, by the trunk of a palm-tree. She said, 'I wish I had died before this, and been completely forgotten.' Whereupon he called her from beneath her: 'Do not worry; your Lord has placed a stream beneath you. And shake the trunk of the palm-tree towards you, and it will drop ripe dates by you. So eat, and drink, and be consoled. And if you see any human, say, "I have vowed a fast to the Most Gracious, so I will not speak to any human today."'

— Quran 19:22–26

=== Jesus ===
==== Speaking as a baby ====
The Syriac Infancy Gospel and the Quran share the legend of Jesus speaking from the cradle as a baby:

...when He was lying in His cradle said to Mary His mother: I am Jesus, the Son of God, the Logos, whom thou hast brought forth, as the Angel Gabriel announced to thee; and my Father has sent me for the salvation of the world.

— Syriac Infancy Gospel 1

Then she came to her people, carrying him. They said, 'O Mary, you have done something terrible. O sister of Aaron, your father was not an evil man, and your mother was not a unchaste.' So she pointed to him. They said, 'How can we speak to an infant in the crib?' He said, 'I am the servant of God. He has given me the Scripture, and made me a prophet. And has made me blessed wherever I may be; and has enjoined on me prayer and charity, so long as I live. And kind to my mother, and He did not make me a disobedient rebel. So Peace is upon me the day I was born, and the day I die, and the Day I get resurrected alive.' That is Jesus son of Mary the word of truth about which they doubt.

— Quran 19:27–34

==== Clay birds ====
Both the apocryphal Infancy Gospel of Thomas and the Quran feature the story of Jesus creating birds of clay:

And having made some soft clay, He fashioned out of it twelve sparrows.

— Infancy Gospel of Thomas 2

A messenger to the Children of Israel: 'I have come to you with a sign from your Lord. I make for you out of clay the figure of a bird; then I breathe into it, and it becomes a bird by God's leave...'

— Quran 3:49

==== Denial of crucifixion ====
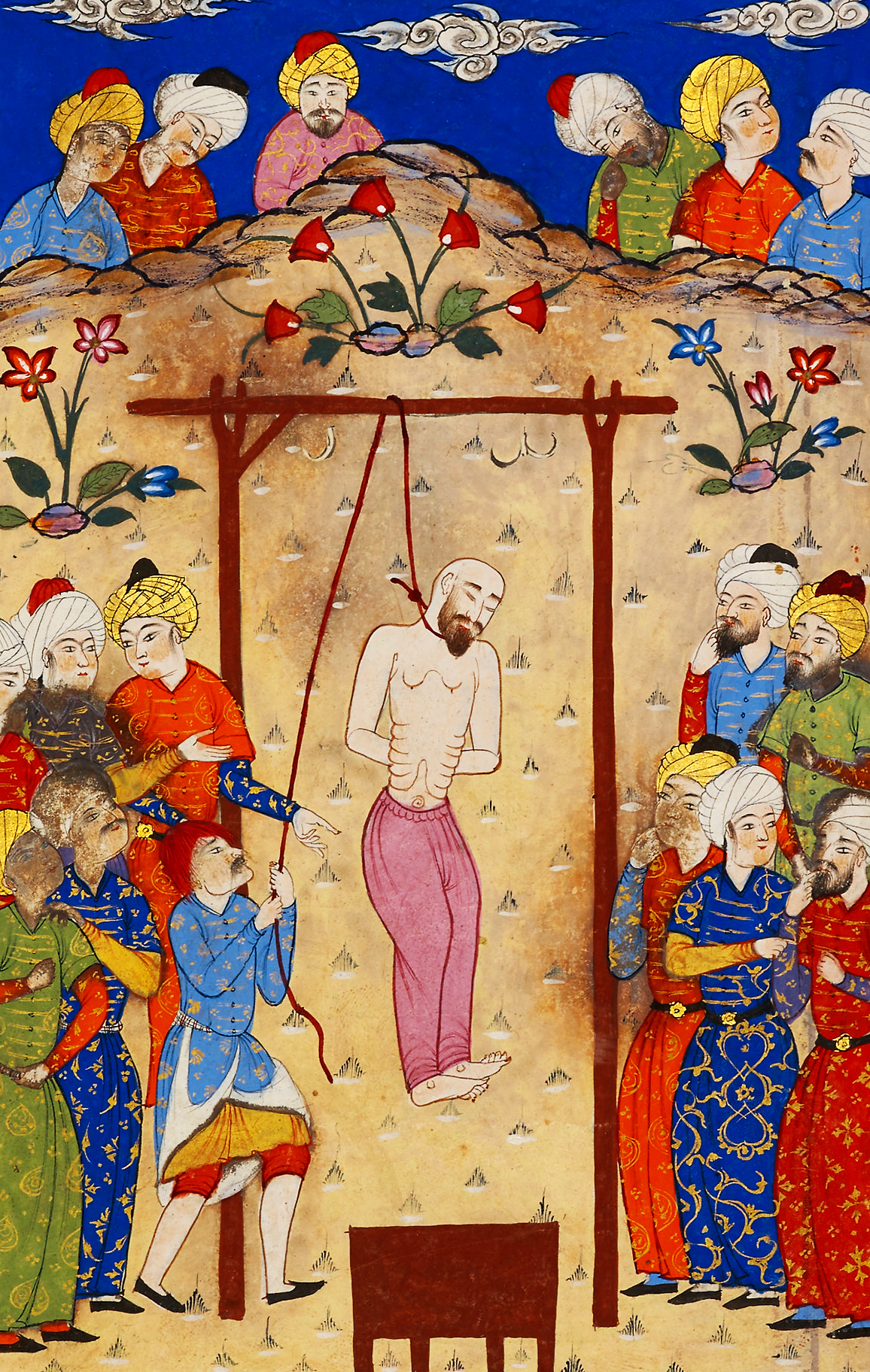
Persian miniature of a man who looks like Isa being hanged

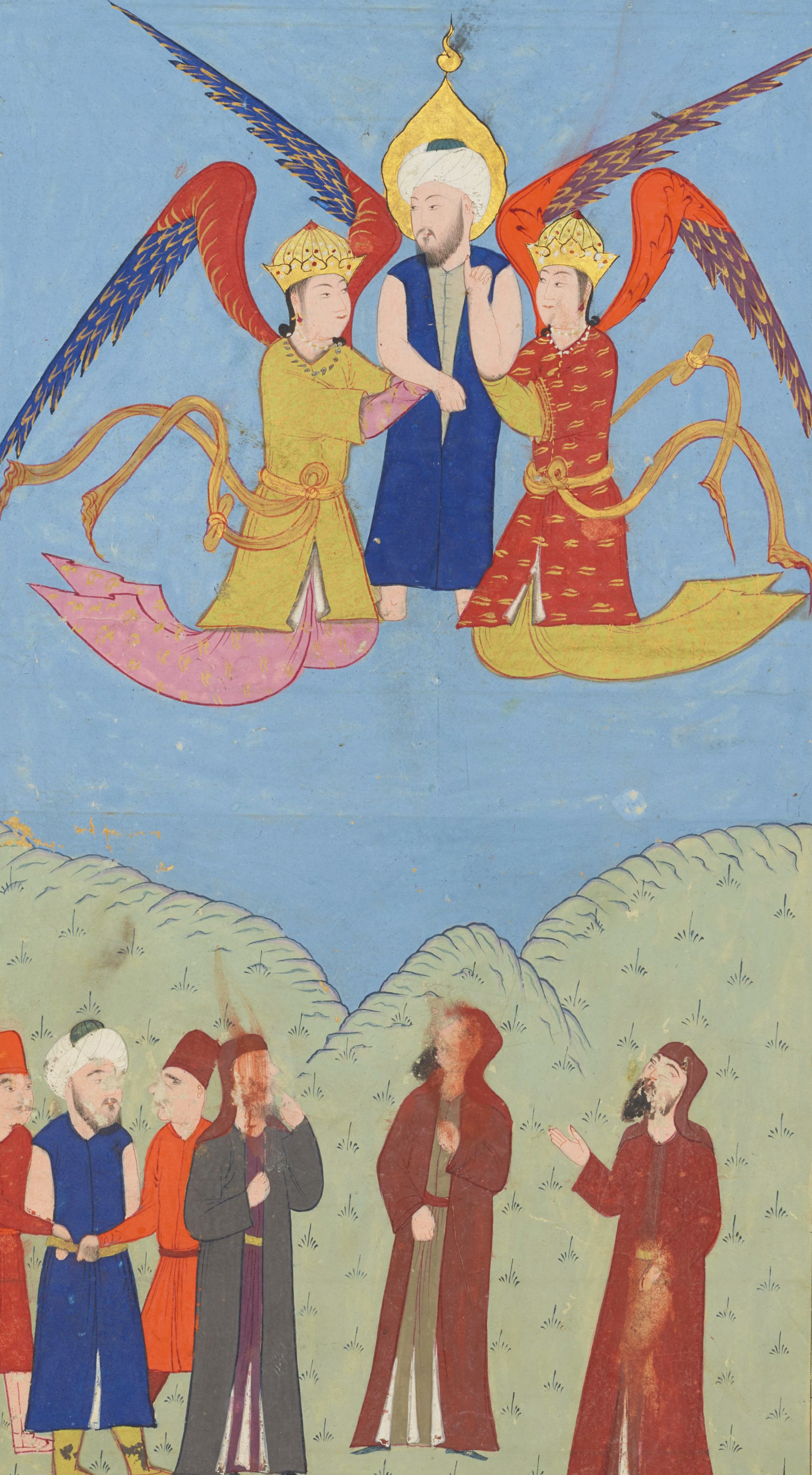
Islamic depiction of Isa's ascension to heaven

The view that Jesus only appeared to be crucified, and did not actually die, predates Islam; it is found in several apocryphal gospels.

Irenaeus, in his book Against Heresies (c. 180 CE), describes Gnostic beliefs that bear remarkable resemblance with the Islamic view:

He did not himself suffer death, but Simon, a certain man of Cyrene, being compelled, bore the cross in his stead; so that this latter being transfigured by him, that he might be thought to be Jesus, was crucified, through ignorance and error, while Jesus himself received the form of Simon, and, standing by, laughed at them. For since he was an incorporeal power, and the nous (mind) of the unborn father, he transfigured himself as he pleased, and thus ascended to him who had sent him, deriding them, inasmuch as he could not be laid hold of, and was invisible to all.

— Against Heresies, Book I, Chapter 24, Section 40

And for their saying, 'We have killed the Messiah, Jesus, the son of Mary, the Messenger of God.' In fact, they did not kill him, nor did they crucify him, but it appeared to them as if they did.

— Quran 4:157

Islamic tradition, similarly, holds that someone else was crucified instead of Jesus. Frequently the substitute is identified as either Judas Iscariot or Simon of Cyrene.

== Dhul-Qarnayn ==
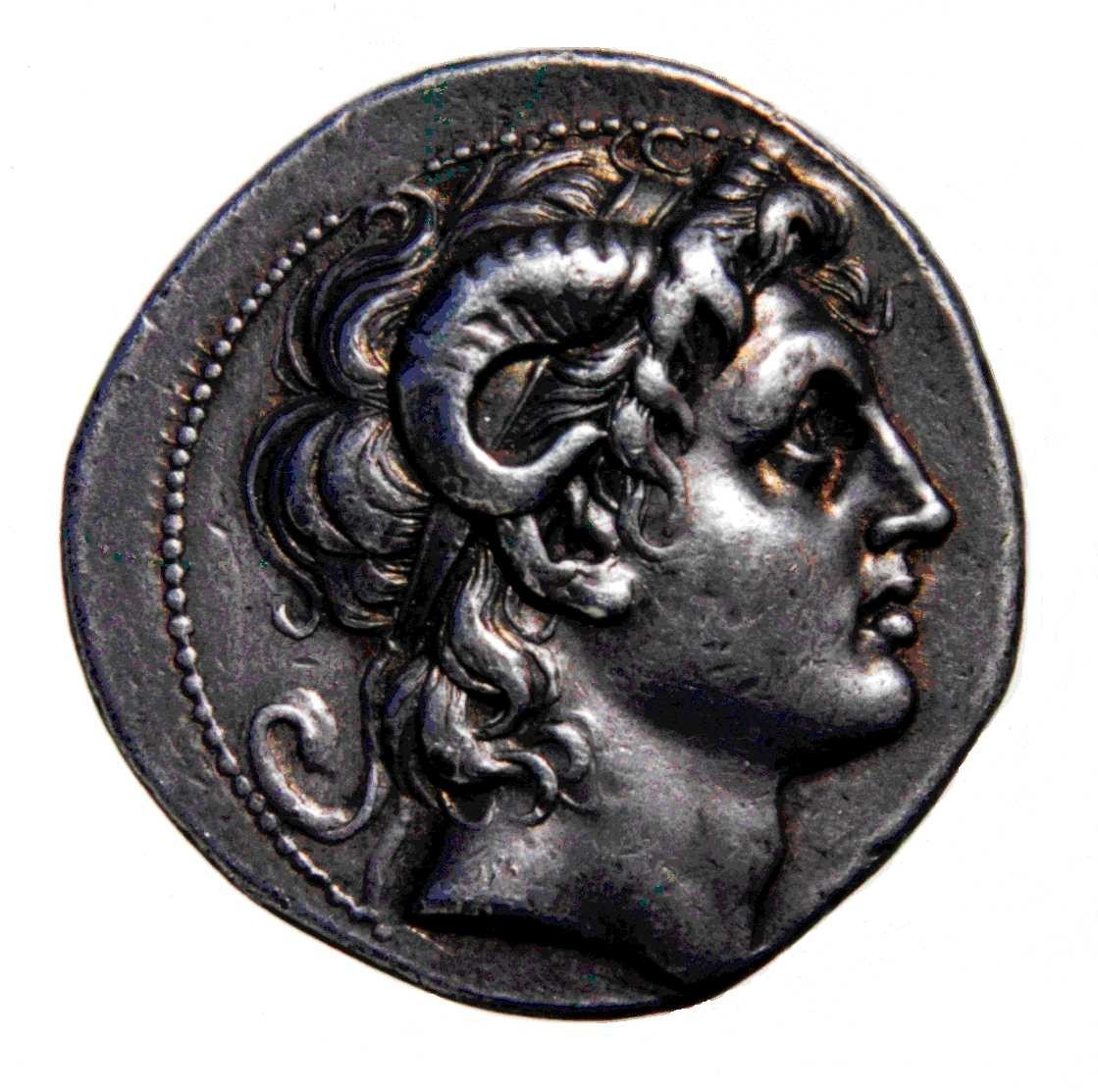
Silver tetradrachm of Alexander the Great shown wearing the horns of the ram-god Zeus-Ammon.

The Quran alludes to a legendary figure referred to as Dhu al-Qarnayn ("he of the two horns"). Early Muslim commentators and historians assimilated Dhu al-Qarnayn to several figures, among them Alexander the Great, the Parthian king Kisrounis, the South-Arabian Himyarite king Sa'b Dhu Marathid, and the North-Arabian Lakhmid king al-Mundhir ibn Imru al-Qays. Some have argued that the origins of the Quranic story lies in the Syriac Alexander Legend. According to Bietenholz, The legend went through much further elaboration in subsequent centuries before eventually finding its way into the Quran through a Syrian version. Others disagree citing dating inconsistencies and missing key elements. Some modern Muslim scholars are in favor of identifying him with Cyrus the Great. However, the majority of modern researchers of the Qur'an as well as Islamic commentators identify Dhu al-Qarnayn as Alexander the Great.

The reasoning behind the name "Two-Horned" is somewhat obscure: the scholar al-Tabari (839–923 CE) held it was because he (Alexander) went from one extremity ("horn") of the world to the other, but it may ultimately derive from the image of Alexander wearing the horns of the ram-god Zeus-Ammon, as popularised on coins throughout the Hellenistic Near East.

According to Muslim records, the Dhu al-Qarnayn story was revealed on the inquisition of Jews who held a high opinion of Cyrus and is also honoured in the Bible; the "He of the Two Horns" (lit. meaning of Dhu al-Qarnayn) is allegedly referring to the two-horned ram mentioned in Book of Daniel, Chapter 8.

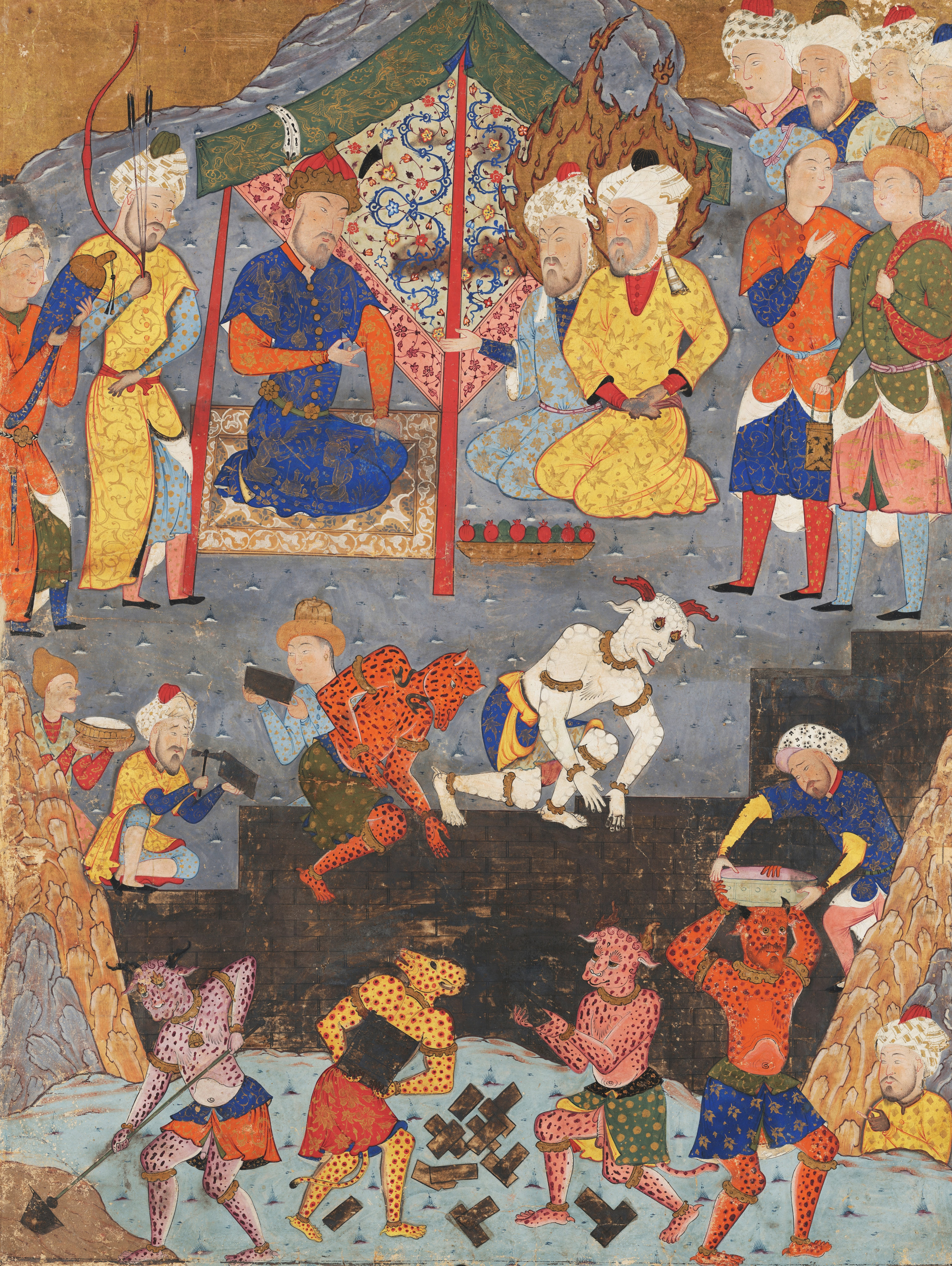
Dhul 'l-Qarayn builds the wall

The wall Dhul-Qarnayn builds on his northern journey may have reflected a distant knowledge of the Great Wall of China (the 12th century scholar al-Idrisi drew a map for Roger II of Sicily showing the "Land of Gog and Magog" in Mongolia), or of various Sassanid Persian walls built in the Caspian area against the northern barbarians, or a conflation of the two.

Dhul-Qarnayn also journeys to the western and eastern extremities ("qarns", tips) of the Earth. In the west he finds the sun setting in a "muddy spring", equivalent to the "poisonous sea" which Alexander found in the Syriac legend. In the Syriac original Alexander tested the sea by sending condemned prisoners into it, but the Quran describes a general administration of justice. In the east both the Syrian legend and the Quran have Alexander/Dhul-Qarnayn find a people who have no protection from the heat of the rising sun.

"Qarn" also means "period" or "century", and the name Dhul-Qarnayn therefore has a symbolic meaning as "He of the Two Ages", the first being the mythological time when the wall is built and the second the age of the end of the world when Allah's shariah, the divine law, is to be removed and Gog and Magog are to be set loose. Modern Islamic apocalyptic writers, holding to a literal reading, put forward various explanations for the absence of the wall from the modern world, some saying that Gog and Magog were the Mongols and that the wall is now gone, others that both the wall and Gog and Magog are present but invisible.

== See also ==
- Biblical narratives in the Quran
- Historical reliability of the Quran
- Biblical and Quranic narratives
- Criticism of the Quran

== Sources ==
- Cook, David B. (2005). Contemporary Muslim Apocalyptic Literature. Syracuse University Press. ISBN 9780815630586.
- Ernst, Carl W. (2011). How to Read the Qur'an: A New Guide, with Select Translations. University of North Carolina Press. ISBN 9781134823871.
- Glassé, Cyril; Smith, Huston (2003). The New Encyclopedia of Islam. Rowman Altamira. ISBN 9780759101906.
- Pinault, David (1992). Story-Telling Techniques in the Arabian Nights. BRILL. ISBN 978-9004095304.
- Van Donzel, Emeri J.; Schmidt, Andrea Barbara (2010). Gog and Magog in Early Eastern Christian and Islamic Sources. Brill. ISBN 978-9004174160.
- Wheeler, Brannon M. (2013). Moses in the Qur'an and Islamic Exegesis. Routledge. ISBN 9781136128905.
