= Nimrod =

Biblical figure

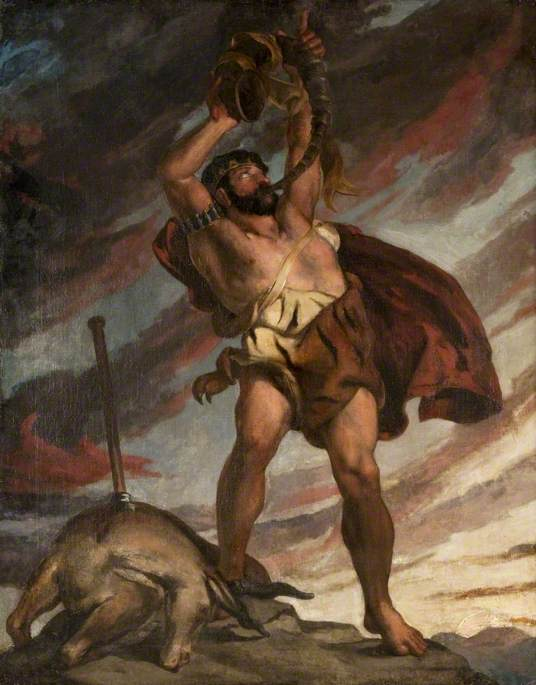
Nimrod by David Scott, 1832

Nimrod (Note: /ˈnɪmrɒd/) (Note: Hebrew: נִמְרוֹד, Modern: Nīmrōd, Tiberian: Nīmrōḏ; Classical Syriac: ܢܡܪܘܕ; Arabic: نُمْرُود, romanized: Numrūd) is a biblical figure mentioned in the Book of Genesis and the Books of Chronicles. The son of Cush and thus the great-grandson of Noah, Nimrod was described as a king in the land of Shinar (Lower Mesopotamia). The Bible states that he was "a mighty hunter before the Lord".

Biblical and non-biblical traditions identify Nimrod as the ruler associated with the Tower of Babel; Jewish, Christian, and Islamic accounts variously portray him as a tyrant who led its builders, turned people from God, and opposed Abraham, even attempting unsuccessfully to kill him by fire. Over time, legends identified him with other figures like Amraphel, Ninus, Zahhak or Zoroaster, and credited him with innovations such as wearing the first crown and introducing idolatry.

There is no direct evidence that Nimrod was an actual person in any of the non-biblical historic records, registers, or king lists (including the Mesopotamian ones, which are older than the biblical record). Historians have failed to match Nimrod with any historically attested figure, or to find any historical, linguistic or genetic link between the Sumerian and Semitic Mesopotamians and the distant and later emerging Kingdom of Kush in modern Sudan. Yigal Levin suggested that the biblical Nimrod was inspired by one of the exclusively Mesopotamian historical figures, Naram-Sin of Akkad, grandson of Sargon, and other scholars have attempted to attribute the inspiration behind Nimrod to one or more Assyrian, Akkadian or Babylonian kings, or to the Assyro-Babylonian god Ninurta.

During the more recent Islamic era, several sites of ruins in the Middle East have been named after Nimrod. He appeared in Dante’s Divine Comedy as a chained giant. In modern North American English slang, a "nimrod” is a synonym for a fool.

== Biblical account ==
Pieter Bruegel's The Tower of Babel depicts a traditional Nimrod inspecting stonemasons.

The first biblical mention of Nimrod is in the Generations of Noah. He is described as the son of Cush, grandson of Ham, and great-grandson of Noah; and as "a mighty one in the earth" and "a mighty hunter before the Lord". This is repeated in 1 Chronicles 1:10, and the "Land of Nimrod" is mentioned as a synonym for Assyria or Mesopotamia in Micah 5:6:

Who will shepherd Assyria’s land with swords,

The land of Nimrod in its gates.
Thus he will deliver [us]
From Assyria, should it invade our land,

And should it trample our country.

Genesis 10:10 says that the "mainstays of his kingdom" (רֵאשִׁית מַמְלַכְתּוֹ rēšit̲ mamlak̲to) were Babylon, Uruk, Akkad and Calneh in Shinar (Mesopotamia). This is understood variously to imply that he either founded these cities, ruled over them, or both. Owing to an ambiguity in the original Hebrew text, it is unclear whether it is he or Ashur who additionally built Nineveh, Resen, Rehoboth-Ir and Nimrud (Kalaḥ); both interpretations are reflected in various English versions. Walter Raleigh devoted several pages in his History of the World (1614) to reciting past scholarship regarding the question of whether it was Nimrod or Ashur who had built the cities in Assyria.

== Traditions and legends ==
In Jewish and Christian tradition, Nimrod is considered the leader of those who built the Tower of Babel in the land of Shinar, although the Bible never states this. Nimrod's kingdom included the cities of Babel, Uruk, Akkad, and perhaps Calneh, in Shinar (Gen 10:10). Josephus believed that the building of Babel and its tower probably began under his direction; this is also the view found in the Talmud (Hullin 89a, Pesahim 94b, Erubin 53a, Avodah Zarah 53b), and later midrash such as Genesis Rabba. Several of these early Judaic sources also assert that the king Amraphel, who wars with Abraham later in Genesis, is none other than Nimrod himself.

Josephus wrote:

Now it was Nimrod who excited them to such an affront and contempt of God. He was the grandson of Ham, the son of Noah, a bold man, and of great strength of hand. He persuaded them not to ascribe it to God, as if it were through his means they were happy, but to believe that it was their own courage which procured that happiness. He also gradually changed the government into tyranny, seeing no other way of turning men from the fear of God, but to bring them into a constant dependence on his power. He also said he would be revenged on God, if He should have a mind to drown the world again; for that he would build a tower too high for the waters to reach. And that he would avenge himself on God for destroying their forefathers. Now the multitude were very ready to follow the determination of Nimrod, and to esteem it a piece of cowardice to submit to God; and they built a tower, neither sparing any pains, nor being in any degree negligent about the work: and, by reason of the multitude of hands employed in it, it grew very high, sooner than any one could expect; but the thickness of it was so great, and it was so strongly built, that thereby its great height seemed, upon the view, to be less than it really was. It was built of burnt brick, cemented together with mortar, made of bitumen, that it might not be liable to admit water. When God saw that they acted so madly, He did not resolve to destroy them utterly, since they were not grown wiser by the destruction of the former sinners; but He caused a tumult among them, by producing in them diverse languages, and causing that, through the multitude of those languages, they should not be able to understand one another. The place wherein they built the tower is now called Babylon, because of the confusion of that language which they readily understood before; for the Hebrews mean by the word Babel, confusion ...

Since Akkad was destroyed and lost with the collapse of the Akkadian Empire in the period 2200–2154 BC (long chronology), the stories mentioning Nimrod seem to recall the late Early Bronze Age. The association with Erech (Babylonian Uruk), a city that lost its prime importance around 2000 BCE as a result of struggles between Isin, Larsa and Elam, also attests the early provenance of the stories of Nimrod. According to some modern-day theorists, their placement in the Bible suggests a Babylonian origin—possibly inserted during the Babylonian captivity.

Judaic interpreters as early as Philo and Yohanan ben Zakkai in the 1st century interpreted "a mighty hunter before the Lord" ("גִבֹּר-צַיִד, לִפְנֵי יְהוָה" gibbor-ṣayiḏ lip̄nē YHWH, lit. "in the face of Yahweh") as signifying "in opposition to the Lord"; a similar interpretation is found in Pseudo-Philo, as well as later in Symmachus. Some rabbinic commentators have also connected the name Nimrod with a Hebrew word meaning "rebel" In Pseudo-Philo (dated c. 70 CE), Nimrod is made leader of the Hamites, while Joktan as leader of the Semites, and Fenech as leader of the Japhethites, are also associated with the building of the Tower. Versions of this story are again picked up in later works such as Apocalypse of Pseudo-Methodius (7th century).

The Book of Jubilees mentions the name "Nebrod" (the Greek form of Nimrod) only as being the father of Azurad, the wife of Eber and mother of Peleg (8:7). This account would thus make Nimrod an ancestor of Abraham, and hence of all Hebrews.

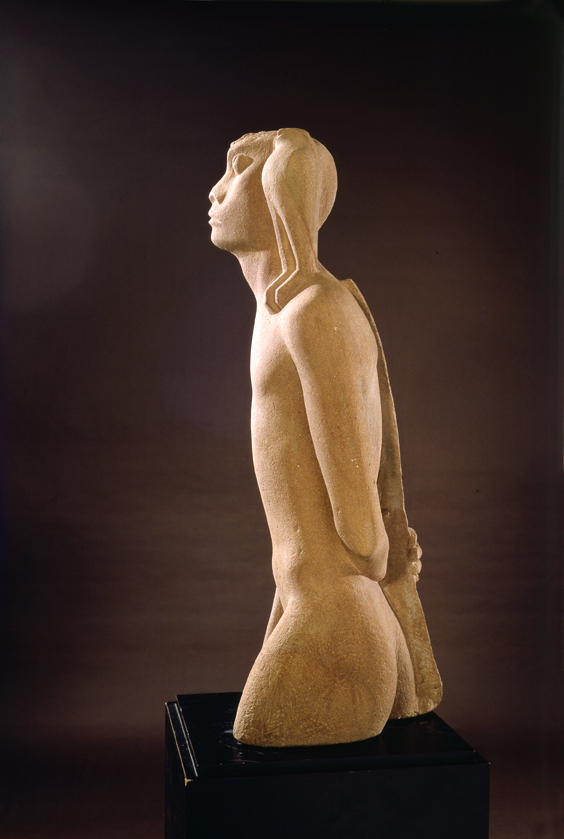
Nimrod by Yitzhak Danziger

The Babylonian Talmud (Gittin 56b) attributes Titus's death to an insect that flew into his nose and picked at his brain for seven years in a repetition of another legend referring to the biblical King Nimrod.

An early Arabic work known as Kitab al-Magall or the Book of Rolls (part of Clementine literature) states that Nimrod built the towns of Hadāniūn, Ellasar, Seleucia, Ctesiphon, Rūhīn, Atrapatene, Telalān, and others, that he began his reign as king over earth when Reu was 163, and that he reigned for 69 years, building Nisibis, Raha (Edessa) and Harran when Peleg was 50. It further adds that Nimrod "saw in the sky a piece of black cloth and a crown". He called upon Sasan the weaver and commanded him to make him a crown like it, which he set jewels on and wore. He was allegedly the first king to wear a crown. "For this reason people who knew nothing about it, said that a crown came down to him from heaven." Later, the book describes how Nimrod established fire worship and idolatry, then received instruction in divination for three years from Bouniter, the fourth son of Noah.

In the Recognitions (R 4.29), one version of the Clementines, Nimrod is equated with the legendary Assyrian king Ninus, who first appears in the Greek historian Ctesias as the founder of Nineveh. However, in another version, the Homilies (H 9:4–6), Nimrod is made to be the same as Zoroaster.

The Syriac Cave of Treasures (c. 350) contains an account of Nimrod very similar to that in the Kitab al-Magall, except that Nisibis, Edessa and Harran are said to be built by Nimrod when Reu was 50, and that he began his reign as the first king when Reu was 130. In this version, the weaver is called Sisan, and the fourth son of Noah is called Yonton.

Jerome, writing c. 390, explains in Hebrew Questions on Genesis that after Nimrod reigned in Babel, "he also reigned in Arach [Erech], that is, in Edissa; and in Achad [Accad], which is now called Nisibis; and in Chalanne [Calneh], which was later called Seleucia after King Seleucus when its name had been changed, and which is now in actual fact called Ctesiphon." However, this traditional identification of the cities built by Nimrod in Genesis is no longer accepted by modern scholars, who consider them to be located in Sumer, not Syria.

The Ge'ez Conflict of Adam and Eve with Satan (c. 5th century) also contains a version similar to that in the Cave of Treasures, but the crown maker is called Santal, and the name of Noah's fourth son who instructs Nimrod is Barvin.

However, Ephrem the Syrian (306–373) relates a contradictory view, that Nimrod was righteous and opposed the builders of the Tower. Similarly, Targum Pseudo-Jonathan (date uncertain) mentions a Jewish tradition that Nimrod left Shinar in southern Mesopotamia and fled to Assyria in northern Mesopotamia, because he refused to take part in building the Tower—for which God rewarded him with the four cities in Assyria, to substitute for the ones in Babel.

Pirke De-Rabbi Eliezer (c. 833) relates the Jewish traditions that Nimrod inherited the garments of Adam and Eve from his father Cush, and that these made him invincible. Nimrod's party then defeated the Japhethites to assume universal rulership. Later, Esau (grandson of Abraham), ambushed, beheaded, and robbed Nimrod. These stories later reappear in other sources including the 16th century Sefer haYashar, which adds that Nimrod had a son named Mardon who was even more wicked.

In the History of the Prophets and Kings by the 9th century Muslim historian al-Tabari, Nimrod has the tower built in Babil, God destroys it, and the language of mankind, formerly Syriac, is then confused into 72 languages. Another Muslim historian of the 13th century, Abu al-Fida, relates the same story, adding that the patriarch Eber (an ancestor of Abraham) was allowed to keep the original tongue, Hebrew in this case, because he would not partake in the building. The 10th-century Muslim historian Masudi recounts a legend making the Nimrod who built the tower to be the son of Mash, the son of Aram, son of Shem, adding that he reigned 500 years over the Nabateans. Later, Masudi lists Nimrod as the first king of Babylon, and states that he dug great canals and reigned 60 years. Still elsewhere, he mentions another king Nimrod, son of Canaan, as the one who introduced astrology and attempted to kill Abraham.

In Armenian legend, the ancestor of the Armenian people, Hayk, defeated Nimrod (sometimes equated with Bel) in a battle near Lake Van.

In the Hungarian legend of the Enchanted Stag (more commonly known as the White Stag [Fehér Szarvas] or Silver Stag), King Nimród (Ménrót), often described as "Nimród the Giant" or "the giant Nimród", descendant of Noah, is the first person referred to as forefather of the Hungarians. He, along with his entire nation, is also the giant responsible for the building of the Tower of Babel—construction of which was supposedly started by him 201 years after the biblical event of the Great Flood. After the catastrophic failure of that most ambitious endeavour and in the midst of the confusion of tongues, Nimród the giant moved to the land of Evilát, where his wife, Enéh gave birth to twin brothers Hunor and Magyar (aka Magor). Father and sons were, all three of them, prodigious hunters, but Nimród especially is the archetypal, consummate, legendary hunter and archer. Hungarian legends held that twin sons of King Nimród, Hunor and Magor were the ancestors of the Huns and the Magyars (Hungarians) respectively, siring their children through the two daughters of King Dul of the Alans, whom they kidnapped after losing track of the silver stag whilst hunting. Both the Huns' and Magyars' historically attested skill with the recurve bow and arrow are attributed to Nimród. (Simon Kézai, personal "court priest" of King Ladislaus the Cuman, in his Gesta Hungarorum, 1282–1285. This tradition can also be found in over twenty other medieval Hungarian chronicles, as well as a German one, according to Dr Antal Endrey in an article published in 1979). The 16th-century Hungarian prelate Nicolaus Olahus claimed that Attila took for himself the title of Descendant of the Great Nimrod.

The hunter god or spirit Nyyrikki, figuring in the Finnish Kalevala as a helper of Lemminkäinen, is associated with Nimrod by some researchers and linguists.

The Nimrod Fortress (Qal'at Namrud in Arabic) in the Golan Heights, actually built during the Crusades by Al-Aziz Uthman, the younger son of Saladin, was anachronistically attributed to Nimrod by later inhabitants of the area.

There is a very brief mention of Nimrod in the Book of Mormon: "(and the name of the valley was Nimrod, being called after the mighty hunter)".

=== Nimrod vs. Abraham ===
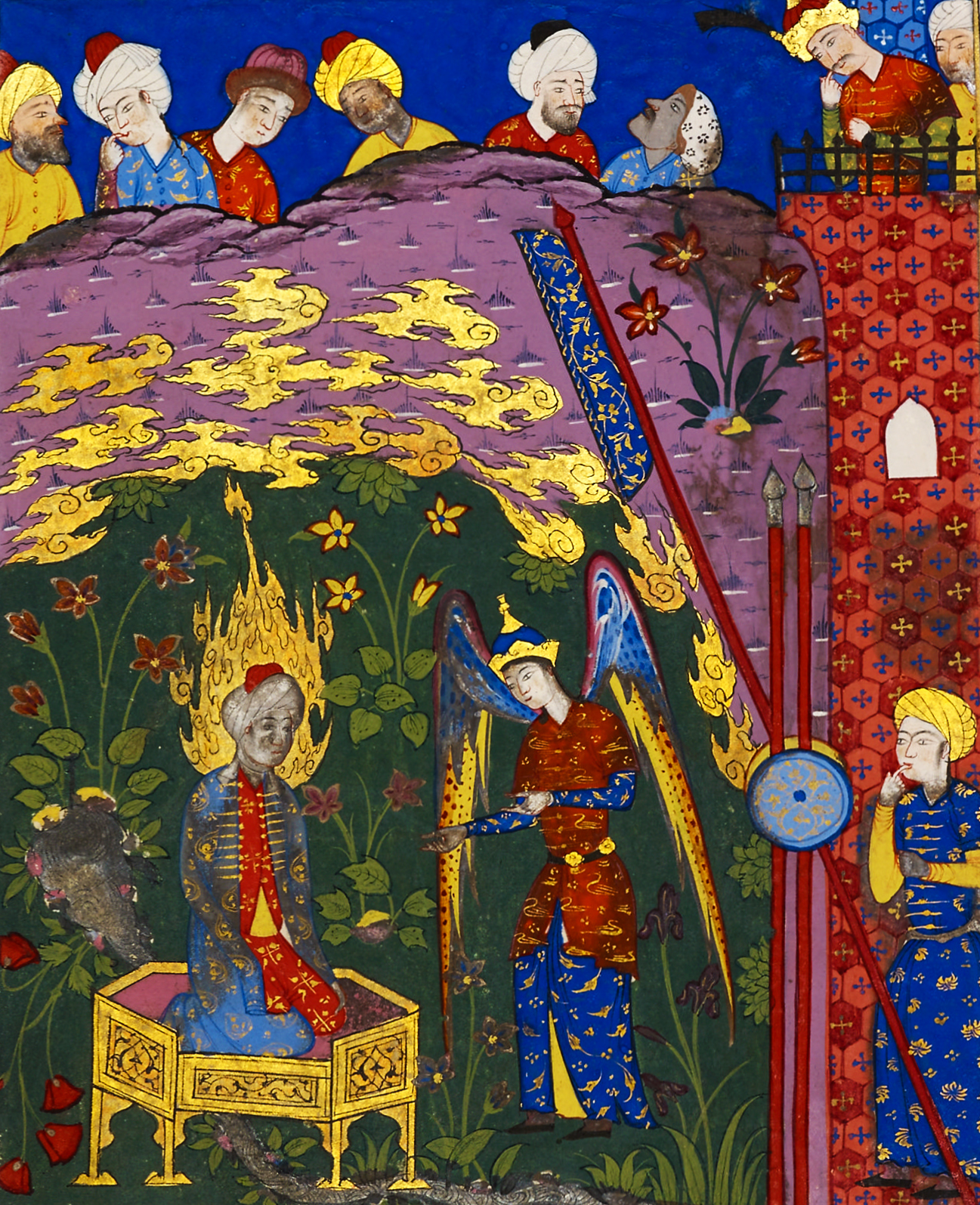
Persian miniature of Jibril protecting Ibrahim from Nimrod's fire.

In Islamic and Jewish traditions, a confrontation between Nimrod and Abraham is said to have taken place. Some stories bring them both together in a cataclysmic collision, seen as a symbol of the confrontation between Good and Evil, or as a symbol of monotheism against polytheism. Some Jewish traditions say only that the two men met and had a discussion. According to K. van der Toorn and P. W. van der Horst, this tradition is first attested in the writings of Pseudo-Philo. The story is also found in the Talmud, and in rabbinical writings in the Middle Ages.

In some versions, such as Flavius Josephus, Nimrod is a man who sets his will against that of God. In others, he proclaims himself a god and is worshipped as such by his subjects, sometimes with his consort Semiramis worshipped as a goddess at his side.

A portent in the stars tells Nimrod and his astrologers of the impending birth of Abraham, who would put an end to idolatry. Nimrod therefore orders the killing of all newborn babies. However, Abraham's mother escapes into the fields and gives birth secretly. At a young age, Abraham recognizes God and starts worshipping him. He confronts Nimrod and tells him face-to-face to cease his idolatry, whereupon Nimrod orders him burned at the stake. In some versions, Nimrod has his subjects gather wood for four whole years, so as to burn Abraham in the biggest bonfire the world had ever seen. Yet when the fire is lit, Abraham walks out unscathed.

In some versions, Nimrod then challenges Abraham to battle. When Nimrod appears at the head of enormous armies, Abraham produces an army of gnats which destroys Nimrod's army. Some accounts have a gnat or mosquito enter Nimrod's brain and drive him out of his mind (a divine retribution which Jewish tradition also assigned to the Roman Emperor Titus, destroyer of the Temple in Jerusalem).

In some versions, Nimrod repents and accepts God, offering numerous sacrifices that God rejects (as with Cain). Other versions have Nimrod give to Abraham, as a conciliatory gift, the giant slave Eliezer, whom some accounts describe as Nimrod's own son (the Bible also mentions Eliezer as Abraham's majordomo, though not making any connection between him and Nimrod; Genesis 15:2).

Still other versions have Nimrod persisting in his rebellion against God, or resuming it. Indeed, Abraham's crucial act of leaving Mesopotamia and settling in Canaan is sometimes interpreted as an escape from Nimrod's revenge. Accounts considered canonical place the building of the Tower many generations before Abraham's birth (as in the Bible, also Jubilees); however in others, it is a later rebellion after Nimrod failed in his confrontation with Abraham. In still other versions, Nimrod does not give up after the Tower fails, but goes on to try storming Heaven in person, in a chariot driven by birds.

The story attributes to Abraham elements from the story of Moses' birth (the cruel king killing innocent babies, with the midwives ordered to kill them) and from the careers of Shadrach, Meshach, and Abednego who emerged unscathed from the fire. Nimrod is thus given attributes of two archetypal cruel and persecuting kings – Nebuchadnezzar and Pharaoh. Some Jewish traditions also identified him with Cyrus, whose birth according to Herodotus was accompanied by portents, which made his grandfather try to kill him.

A confrontation is also found in the Quran, between a king, not mentioned by name, and Ibrahim (Arabic for "Abraham"). Some Muslim commentators assign Nimrod as the king. In the quranic narrative Ibrahim has a discussion with the king, the former argues that God is the one who gives life and causes death, whereas the unnamed king replies that he gives life and causes death. Ibrahim refutes him by stating that God brings the Sun up from the East, and so he asks the king to bring it from the West. The king is then perplexed and angered. The commentaries on this surah offer a wide variety of embellishments of this narrative, one of which by Ibn Kathir, a 14th-century scholar, adding that Nimrod showed his rule over life and death by killing a prisoner and freeing another.

Whether or not conceived as having ultimately repented, Nimrod remained in Jewish and Islamic tradition an emblematic evil person, an archetype of an idolater and a tyrannical king. In rabbinical writings up to the present, he is almost invariably referred to as "Nimrod the Evil" (Hebrew: נמרוד הרשע).

Nimrod is mentioned by name in several places in the Baháʼí scriptures, including the Kitáb-i-Íqán, the primary theological work of the Baháʼí Faith. There it is said that Nimrod "dreamed a dream" which his soothsayers interpreted as signifying the birth of a new star in heaven. A herald is then said to have appeared in the land announcing "the coming of Abraham". Nimrod is also mentioned in one of the earliest writings of the Báb (the herald of the Baháʼí Faith). Citing examples of God's power, he asks: "Has He not, in past days, caused Abraham, in spite of His seeming helplessness, to triumph over the forces of Nimrod?"

The story of Abraham's confrontation with Nimrod did not remain within the confines of learned writings and religious treatises, but also conspicuously influenced popular culture. A notable example is "Quando el Rey Nimrod" ("When King Nimrod"), one of the most well-known folksongs in Ladino (the Judeo-Spanish language), apparently written during the reign of King Alfonso X of Castile. Beginning with the words: "When King Nimrod went out to the fields/ Looked at the heavens and at the stars/He saw a holy light in the Jewish quarter/A sign that Abraham, our father, was about to be born", the song gives a poetic account of the persecutions perpetrated by the cruel Nimrod and the miraculous birth and deeds of the savior Abraham.

=== Islamic narrative ===
The Quran states, "Have you not considered him who had an argument with Abraham about his Lord, because God had given him the kingdom (i.e. he was prideful)?" Abraham says, "My Lord is He Who gives life and causes death." The king answers, "I give life and cause death". At this point some commentaries add new narratives like Nimrod bringing forth two men, who were sentenced to death previously. He orders the execution of one while freeing the other one. Then Abraham says, "Indeed, God brings up the sun from the east, so bring it up from the west." This causes the king to exile him, and he leaves for the Levant.

Although Nimrod's name is not specifically stated in the Quran, Islamic scholars hold that the "king" mentioned was him. Other traditional stories also exist around Nimrod, which have resulted in him being referenced as a tyrant in Muslim cultures.

According to Mujahid ibn Jabr, "Four people gained control over the Earth, east and west, two believers and two disbelievers. The two believers were Solomon (Sulayman in Islamic texts) and Dhul Qarnayn, and the two disbelievers were Nebuchadnezzar II and Nimrod. No one but they gained power over it."

=== Midrash Rabba version ===
The following version of the confrontation between Abraham and Nimrod appears in the Midrash Rabba, a major compilation of Jewish Scriptural exegesis. The part in which this appears, the Genesis Rabbah (Chapter 38, 13), is considered to date from the sixth century.

נטלו ומסרו לנמרוד. אמר לו: עבוד לאש. אמר לו אברהם: ואעבוד למים, שמכבים את האש? אמר לו נמרוד: עבוד למים! אמר לו: אם כך, אעבוד לענן, שנושא את המים? אמר לו: עבוד לענן! אמר לו: אם כך, אעבוד לרוח, שמפזרת עננים? אמר לו: עבוד לרוח! אמר לו: ונעבוד לבן אדם, שסובל הרוחות? אמר לו: מילים אתה מכביר, אני איני משתחוה אלא לאוּר - הרי אני משליכך בתוכו, ויבא אלוה שאתה משתחוה לו ויצילך הימנו! היה שם הרן עומד. אמר: מה נפשך, אם ינצח אברהם - אומַר 'משל אברהם אני', ואם ינצח נמרוד - אומַר 'משל נמרוד אני'. כיון שירד אברהם לכבשן האש וניצול, אמרו לו: משל מי אתה? אמר להם: משל אברהם אני! נטלוהו והשליכוהו לאור, ונחמרו בני מעיו ויצא ומת על פני תרח אביו. וכך נאמר: וימת הרן על פני תרח אביו. (בראשית רבה ל"ח, יג)	(...) He [Abraham] was given over to Nimrod. [Nimrod] told him: Worship the Fire! Abraham said to him: Shall I then worship the water, which puts off the fire! Nimrod told him: Worship the water! [Abraham] said to him: If so, shall I worship the cloud, which carries the water? [Nimrod] told him: Worship the cloud! [Abraham] said to him: If so, shall I worship the wind, which scatters the clouds? [Nimrod] said to him: Worship the wind! [Abraham] said to him: And shall we worship the human, who withstands the wind? Said [Nimrod] to him: You pile words upon words, I bow to none but the fire—in it shall I throw you, and let the God to whom you bow come and save you from it! Haran [Abraham's brother] was standing there. He said [to himself]: what shall I do? If Abraham wins, I shall say: "I am of Abraham's [followers]", if Nimrod wins I shall say "I am of Nimrod's [followers]". When Abraham went into the furnace and survived, Haran was asked: "Whose [follower] are you?" and he answered: "I am Abraham's!". [Then] they took him and threw him into the furnace, and his belly opened and he died and predeceased Terach, his father. [The Bible, Genesis 11:28, mentions Haran predeceasing Terach, but gives no details.]|—

== Historical interpretations ==
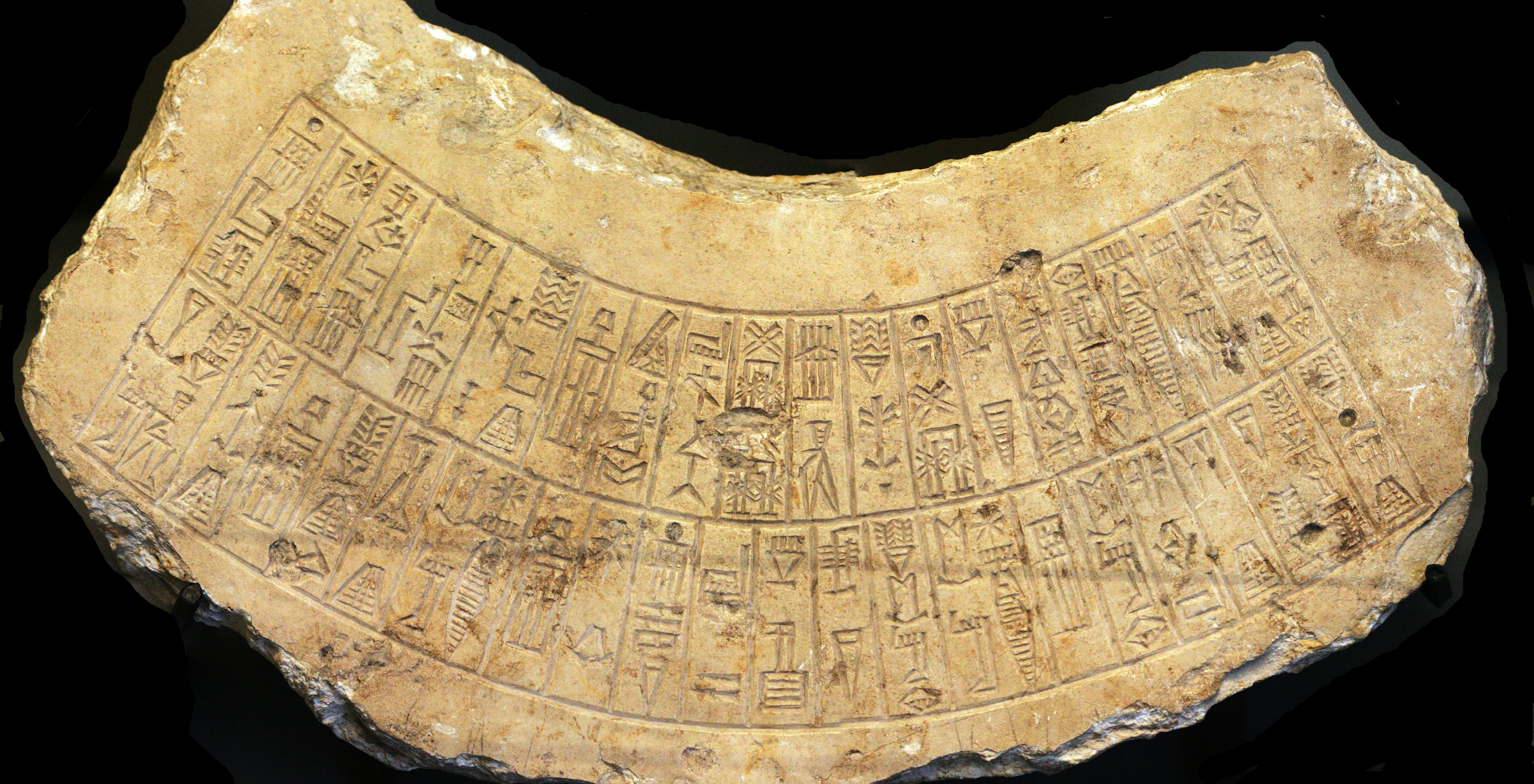
Inscription of Naram Sin found at the city of Marad

Historians, Orientalists, Assyriologists and mythographers have long tried to find links between the Nimrod of biblical texts and real historically attested figures in Mesopotamia or its surrounds, with no success. Significantly, no king with a name similar to Nimrod appears on any historical king-list from Sumer, Akkad, Assyria or Babylon, nor has the name Nimrod been found in any other writings from Mesopotamia or its neighbours during the Bronze Age, Iron Age or pre-Christian Classical Age.

Since the city of Akkad was destroyed around 2200–2154 BC (long chronology), the much later biblical stories mentioning Nimrod seem to be inspired by the late Early Bronze Age. The association with Erech (Sumero-Akkadian Uruk), a city that lost its prime importance around 2000 BC as a result of struggles between Isin, Ur, Larsa and Elam, may have influenced the later stories of Nimrod. Several Mesopotamian ruins were given Nimrod's name by invading 8th-century AD Muslim Arabs, including the ruins of the Assyrian city of Kalhu.

Among the unsuccessful attempts to connect Nimrod with historical figures, the 4th century Christian Bishop Eusebius of Caesarea identified Nimrod with Euechoios of Chaldea, a figure described as the first king after the flood by the Babylonian historian Berossus from the 3rd century BC (though modern historians have found that Chaldea was a small state in southeast Mesopotamia not found until the late 9th century BC). George Syncellus (c. 800) also had access to Berossus, and he identified Euechoios with the biblical Nimrod. However, like Nimrod, no king named Euechoios appears anywhere in Mesopotamian record.

More recently, Sumerologists have suggested additionally connecting both this Euechoios, and the king of Babylon and grandfather of Gilgamesh who appears in the oldest copies of Aelian (c. 200 AD) as Euechoros, with the name of the founder of Uruk known from cuneiform sources as Enmerkar.

In 1920, J. D. Prince also suggested a possible link between the Lord (Ni) of Marad and Nimrod. He mentioned how Dr. Kraeling was now inclined to connect Nimrod historically with Lugal-Banda, a mythological Sumerian king mentioned in Poebel, Historical Texts, 1914, whose seat was at the city Marad.

According to Ronald Hendel the name Nimrod is probably a much later polemical distortion of the Semitic Assyrian god Ninurta, a prominent god in Mesopotamian religion who had cult centers in a number of Assyrian cities such as Kalhu, and also in Babylon, and was a patron god of a number of Assyrian kings, and that "Cush" is a mistranslation of Kish, a Mesopotamian city, rather than the state that arose in modern Sudan some time later. Nimrod's imperial ventures described in Genesis may be based on the conquests of the Assyrian king Tukulti-Ninurta I.

Julian Jaynes also indicates Tukulti-Ninurta I (a powerful king of the Middle Assyrian Empire) as the inspiration for Nimrod.

Alexander Hislop, in his tract The Two Babylons (1853), identified Nimrod with Ninus (also a mythical figure unattested anywhere in Mesopotamian king lists), who according to Greek mythology was a Mesopotamian king and husband of Queen Semiramis, with a whole host of deities throughout the Mediterranean world, and with the Persian Zoroaster. The identification with Ninus follows that of the Clementine Recognitions; the one with Zoroaster, that of the Clementine Homilies, both works part of Clementine literature. Hislop attributed to Semiramis and Nimrod the invention of polytheism and, with it, goddess worship, and that their incestuous male offering was Tammuz. He also claimed that the Catholic Church was a millennia-old secret conspiracy, founded by Semiramis and Nimrod to propagate the pagan religion of ancient Babylon. Grabbe and others have rejected the book's arguments as based on a flawed understanding of the texts, but variations of them are accepted among some groups of evangelical Protestants.

There was a historical Assyrian queen Shammuramat in the 9th century BC, in reality the wife of Shamshi-Adad V, a king of the Neo-Assyrian Empire, whom Assyriologists have identified as the inspiration behind the much later Greco-Persian legends of Semiramis.

In David Rohl's theory, Enmerkar, the Sumerian founder of Uruk, was the original inspiration for Nimrod, because the story of Enmerkar and the Lord of Aratta bears a few similarities to the legend of Nimrod and the Tower of Babel, and because the -KAR in Enmerkar means "hunter". Additionally, Enmerkar is said to have had ziggurats built in both Uruk and Eridu, which Rohl postulates was the site of the original Babel.

Others have attempted to conflate Nimrod with Amraphel, a supposed king in Mesopotamia, but yet again, one who is himself historically unattested in Mesopotamian records.

George Rawlinson believed Nimrod was Belus, based on the fact Babylonian and Assyrian inscriptions bear the names Bel-Nibru. The word Nibru in the East Semitic Akkadian language of Akkad, Assyria and Babylonia comes from a root meaning to 'pursue' or to make 'one flee', and as Rawlinson pointed out not only does this closely resemble Nimrod's name but it also perfectly fits the description of Nimrod in Genesis 10:9 as a great hunter. The Belus-Nimrod equation or link is also found in many old works such as Moses of Chorene and the Book of the Bee. Nibru, in the Sumerian language, was the original name of the city of Nippur.

Joseph Poplicha wrote in 1929 about the identification of Nimrod in the first dynasty or Uruk.

More recently, Yigal Levin (2002) suggests that the fictional Nimrod was a recollection of Sargon of Akkad and also of his grandson Naram-Sin, with the name "Nimrod" derived from the latter. He argues that:

The biblical Nimrod, then, is not a total counterpart of any one historical character. He is rather the later composite Hebrew equivalent of the Sargonid dynasty: the first, mighty king to rule after the flood. Later influence modified the legend in the Mesopotamian tradition, adding such details as the hero's name, his territory and some of his deeds, and most important his title, "King of Kish", again attesting to Cush being a mistranslation of Kish The much later editors of the Book of Genesis dropped much of the original story and mistakenly misidentified and mistranslated the Mesopotamian Kish with the "Hamitic" Cush, there being no ancient geographical, ethnic, linguistic, cultural, genetic or historical connection between Cush (in modern northern Sudan) and Mesopotamia.

== In popular culture ==
=== Idiom ===
In modern North American English slang, the term "nimrod" is often used to mean a dimwitted or a stupid person. This usage is often said to have been popularized by the Looney Tunes cartoon character Bugs Bunny sarcastically referring to the hunter Elmer Fudd as "nimrod" to highlight the difference between "mighty hunter" and "poor little Nimrod", i.e. Fudd. However, it is in fact Daffy Duck who refers to Fudd as "my little Nimrod" in the 1948 short "What Makes Daffy Duck", although Bugs Bunny does refer to Yosemite Sam as "the little Nimrod" in the 1951 short "Rabbit Every Monday". Both cartoons were voiced by Mel Blanc.

=== Literature ===
In the Divine Comedy by Dante Alighieri (written 1308–1321), Nimrod is portrayed as a giant, a common occurrence in the Medieval period. With the giants Ephialtes, Antaeus, Briareus, Tityos, and Typhon, he stands in chains on the outer edge of Hell's Circle of Treachery. His only line is "Raphèl mai amècche zabì almi", words which unintelligibility emphasizes his guilt for the confusion of languages after the tower of Babel.

=== Music ===
Variation IX of Edward Elgar’s Enigma Variations is named Nimrod, after his friend and publisher, August Jaeger (whose surname is German for hunter, befitting the monicker).

== Legacy ==
During the Iraq War era, a unified mobilization discourse emerged from both Sunni and Shia resistance factions, which projected the epithet "Nimrod" onto the United States and its forces. This rhetoric came as a response to the targeting and shelling of mosques and sacred shrines during the battles of Fallujah and Najaf in 2004.

== See also ==
- Nim (programming language) – Programming language was named after Nimrod, later shortened to Nim
- Hawker Siddeley Nimrod
- Operation Nimrod
- Nimrod – 1997 album by Green Day
- Nimrod - A mutant-hunting character featured in Marvel Comics' X-Men series.
