= Chrysus =

God of gold in Greek mythology

Chrysus (Ancient Greek: Χρυσός, romanized: Khrusos, lit. 'gold') in Greek mythology is a minor god and the personification of gold.

== Mythology ==
Chrysus is mentioned by Pindar:

Gold is a child of Delos father of metals; neither moth nor rust devoureth it; but the mind of man is devoured by this supreme possession.

— Pindar, Fragment 222 (trans. Sandys) (Greek lyric 5th century BC)

In his Isthmian Odes, Pindar also wrote:

Mother of the Sun, Theia of many names, for your sake men honor gold as more powerful than anything else,

Furthermore, a scholium on those lines wrote ἐκ Θείας καὶ Ὑπερίονος ὁ Ἥλιος, ἐκ δὲ Ἡλίου ὁ χρυσός, denoting a special connection of Theia, the goddess of sight and brilliance, with gold as the mother of Helios the Sun.

== See also ==
- List of Greek deities
- Plutus
