= Pape Satàn, pape Satàn aleppe =

Line in Dante's Inferno

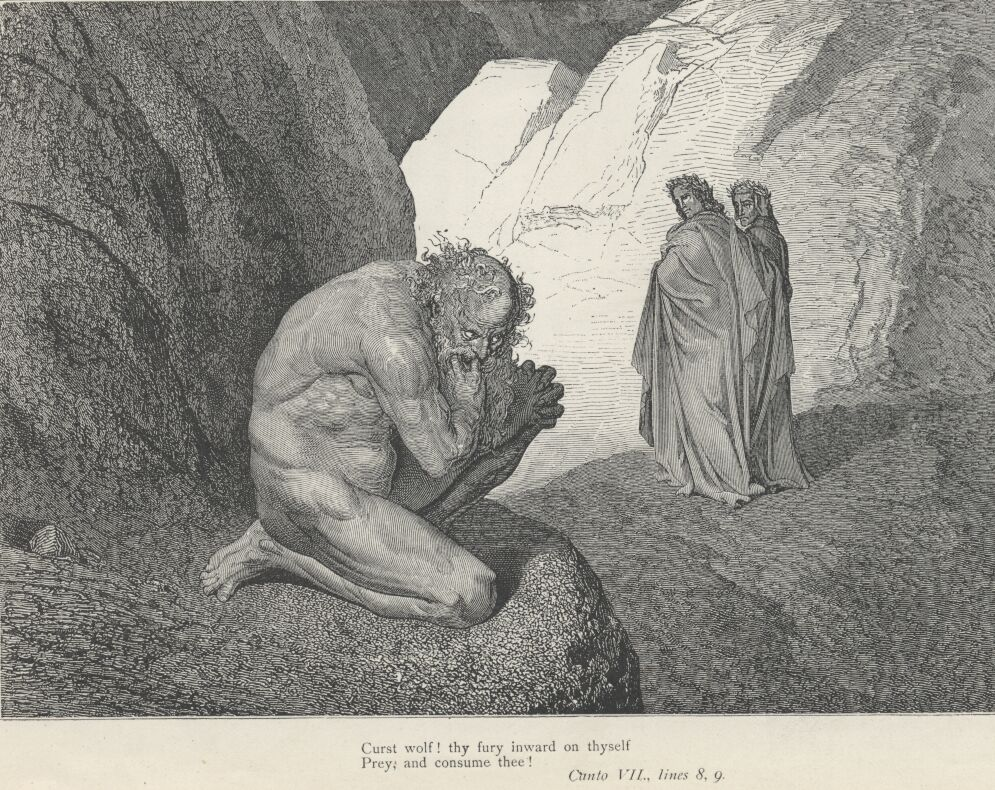
Plutus in Divina Commedia, in an engraving by Gustave Doré.

"Pape Satàn, pape Satàn aleppe" is the opening line of Canto VII of Dante Alighieri's Inferno. The line, consisting of three words, is famous for the uncertainty of its meaning, and there have been many attempts to interpret it. Modern commentators on the Inferno view it as some kind of demonic invocation to Satan.

== Text ==
The line is a shout by Plutus. Plutus was originally the Roman god of wealth, but in the Inferno, Dante has made Plutus into a repulsive demon who guards the fourth circle, where souls who have abused their wealth through greed or improvidence are punished. The full strophe, plus the following four, which describe Dante's and Virgil's entire meeting and confrontation with Plutus reads:

"Pape Satàn, pape Satàn aleppe!",
cominciò Pluto con la voce chioccia;
e quel savio gentil, che tutto seppe,

disse per confortarmi: "Non ti noccia
la tua paura; ché, poder ch'elli abbia,
non ci torrà lo scender questa roccia."

Poi si rivolse a quella 'nfiata labbia,
e disse: "Taci, maladetto lupo!
consuma dentro te con la tua rabbia.

Non è sanza cagion l'andare al cupo:
vuolsi ne l'alto, là dove Michele
fé la vendetta del superbo strupo."

Quali dal vento le gonfiate vele
caggiono avvolte, poi che l'alber fiacca,
tal cadde a terra la fiera crudele.

Translation:

"Pape Satan, Pape Satan, Aleppe!"
Thus Plutus with his clucking voice began;
And that benignant Sage, who all things knew,

Said, to encourage me: "Let not thy fear
Harm thee; for any power that he may have
Shall not prevent thy going down this crag."

Then he turned round unto that bloated lip,
And said: "Be silent, thou accursed wolf;
Consume within thyself with thine own rage.

Not causeless is this journey to the abyss;
Thus is it willed on high, where Michael wrought
Vengeance upon the proud adultery."

Even as the sails inflated by the wind
Involved together fall when snaps the mast,
So fell the cruel monster to the earth.

— Translated by Henry Wadsworth Longfellow

The scant information that can be gleaned from the text is this:

1. Virgil understands the meaning ("And that benignant Sage, who all things knew..."), and is replying.
2. That the line is just the beginning of something else ("Thus Plutus with his clucking voice began...").
3. It is an expression of anger ("And said: "Be silent, thou accursed wolf / Consume within thyself with thine own rage.").
4. That it has the effect of a threat to Dante ("And that benignant Sage, who all things knew, / Said, to encourage me: "Let not thy fear / Harm thee; for any power that he may have / Shall not prevent thy going down this crag.").

== Possible explanations ==
The only word with fairly obvious meaning is "Satàn", namely Satan; which comes from the Hebrew word הַשָׂטָן (ha-Satan), which translated literally means "the adversary".

=== The earliest interpretations ===
Some interpretations from the earliest commentators on the Divine Comedy include:

- The word "pape" might be a rendering of Latin papae, or from Greek παπαί (papaí). Both words are interjections of anger or surprise, attested in ancient authors (comparable to the English "damn!", or just "oh!").
- The word "aleppe" could be an Italian version of the word for "alef", the Hebrew letter א (a) (compare Phoenician alep and Greek alpha). The consonant shift here is comparable to that in Giuseppe, the Italian version of the name Joseph. In Hebrew, alef also means "number one" or "the origin that contains everything". It may also be interpreted as a metaphor for the "head", "the first and foremost". This was an attribute for God in late medieval expressions, meaning "the majesty" (of God). "Alef" was also a medieval interjection (like "Oh God!").

With these interpretations, the verse would mean "Oh, Satan, o Satan, god, king!".

=== The prayer theory ===
The word "pape" might come from Latin Pape, an old Roman term for "emperor", or "father". The double mention of "pape" together with "Satan" (here interpreted as the fallen angel Satan) and the break (the comma) in the hendecasyllable, gives it a tone of a prayer or an invocation to Satan, although there is no apparent verb. It might be also an invocation of the evil within the intruders.

=== Domenico Guerri's theory ===
Domenico Guerri researched medieval glossaries thoroughly in 1908, and interpreted it as "Oh Satan, oh Satan, God", which he wrote was meant as an invocation against travellers.

=== Abboud Rashid's theory ===
Abboud Abu Rashid, the first translator of the Divine Comedy into Arabic (1930–1933), interpreted this verse as a phonetic translation of the spoken Arabic, "Bab Al-Shaytan, Bab Al-Shaytan, Ahlibu!", meaning "The door of Satan, the door of Satan, proceed downward!". According to some scholars, although Dante did not speak Arabic, he could have drawn some inspiration from Islamic sources. Doubts arise, however, because the meaning of this interpretation does not really match the reaction of Dante and Virgil (anger and fear), nor Virgil's answer, and Dante directly indicts Muhammad (or Mahomet) as a spreader of religious schism.

=== The Hebrew theory ===
Some commentators claim that the sentence is phonetic Hebrew, "Bab-e-sciatan, bab-e-sciatan, alep!". This would be the opposite of the sentence that Jesus spoke in the Gospel according to St Matthew 16:18, "...and the gates of Hell shall not prevail against it". The meaning of this utterance would be that Hell (Satan) has conquered.

=== The French theories ===
Two suggestions have been proposed interpreting the words of Plutus as French.

The first reads: "Paix, paix, Satan, paix, paix, Satan, allez, paix!" ("Peace, peace, Satan, peace, peace, Satan, come on, peace!"). The latter phrase can be interpreted as "Satan, make peace!". Benvenuto Cellini, in his autobiography, reports hearing the phrase in Paris, transliterating it as "Phe phe, Satan, phe phe, Satan, alè, phe" and interpreting it as "Be quiet! Be quiet Satan, get out of here and be quiet."

The second interpretation, elaborating on the first, is: "Pas paix Satan, pas paix Satan, à l'épée" ("No peace, Satan! No peace, Satan! To the sword!"). According to Giovanni Ventura, Dante's intention was to hide Philip IV of France behind Plutus, god of greed, and that was the reason why Plutus was made to speak French instead of Greek. Dante considered Philip the Handsome as the enemy of Christianity, and of Papacy, due to his rapacity. The words of Plutus are also a blaspheme quotation of Jesus' words in the Gospel Matthew 10:34 ("Think not that I am come to send peace on earth: I came not to send [or bring] peace, but a sword."). This interpretation implies a transposition of the tonic accent, for metrical purposes, from the 11th to the 10th syllable, from "aleppé" to "alèppe", similarly to what happens at line 28, where the tonic accent shifts from "pur lì" to "pùr li".

=== The Flemish theory ===
Another solution published by Giancarlo Lombardi in April 2021 asserts that the words are the phonetic transcription of a sentence in the medieval Flemish dialect of Bruges (Middelwestvlaamsch), written as "Pape Satan, pape Satan, help!" or "helpe!" and pronounced as "Pape Satan, pape Satan, alp!" or "alpe!" (This pronunciation, characteristic of Bruges and its region of West Flanders, is attested since 1150–1200 until the present day.) Dante would clearly indicate that he heard these words "with clucking voice" because of the guttural pronunciation of "alp" (especially the "L" — in Flemish/Dutch as in English, "kloek" is indeed the "chioccia"), typical of that dialect. By the phenomena known as anaptyxis and perhaps paragogy, typical of the Tuscan dialect of his day (as in "salamelecco" from As-salamu alaykum, also in modern Italian usage, and in "amecche" from Hebrew "amech" or "amcha" in Inf., XXXI, 67), Dante arrives at the transcription found in the poem. Dante might have used specifically the Flemish dialect of Bruges because of the intense commercial relationships that existed between Florence and Bruges since the 13th century (Plutus being the god of wealth). The poem includes two references to Bruges in Inf, XV and in Purg, XX and further references to the Tuscan families involved in business there. The meaning in Flemish would be "Father Satan, father Satan, help!", where "Pape" refers to the priest at the head of a parish. (The Middelwestvlaamsch word for "Pope" would be Pawes, but it is very unlikely that Dante would have known Flemish.) The verse would then allude to the Gospel of Matthew (Matthew 16 and Matthew 21–23), and its intended meaning would be to condemn the exercising of temporal power by the Western Church.
