= Abraham and the Idol Shop =

Biblical story

Abraham and the Idol Shop is a midrash that appears in Genesis Rabbah chapter 38. It tells about the early life of Abraham. The commentary explains what happened to Abraham when he was a young boy working in his father's idol shop. The story has been used as a way to discuss monotheism and faith in general.

== Characters ==
=== Terah ===
Terah is a Biblical figure from the book of Genesis. He is the father of three children including the Patriarch Abraham. According to Jewish tradition, Terah was an idolater. Terah also made and sold idols, as the Midrash Genesis Rabbah 38 explains.

=== Abraham ===
Abraham is the first patriarch and is seen as the father of the three Abrahamic religions, Judaism, Christianity, and Islam. The later life of Abraham is told in the book of Genesis Chapters 11–25. The missing years of Abraham's early childhood are explained through a series of Midrashim.

=== Haran ===
Haran is the son of Terah, brother of Abraham, and the father of Lot. Haran died in Ur of the Chaldees, in the presence of his father, Terah.

=== Nimrod ===
Nimrod is a descendant of Noah and is considered to be a "mighty one on the earth." There is no description of a biblical interaction between Nimrod and Abraham. According to many Jewish and Islamic sources, the two did meet, and their meeting was symbolic of the confrontation between either:

- good (Abraham) and evil (Nimrod) or
- monotheism (Abraham) and polytheism (Nimrod)

== Basis of the Midrash ==
The Midrash is based on Genesis 11:28,

And Haran died in the presence of his father Terah in the land of his nativity, in Ur of the Chaldees.

The question the rabbis are trying to answer with the Midrash is why and how did Haran die in the presence of his father.

== Content of the Midrash ==
According to Genesis Rabbah 38.13, Ḥiyya b. Abba, a third-generation Amora, told the following story:

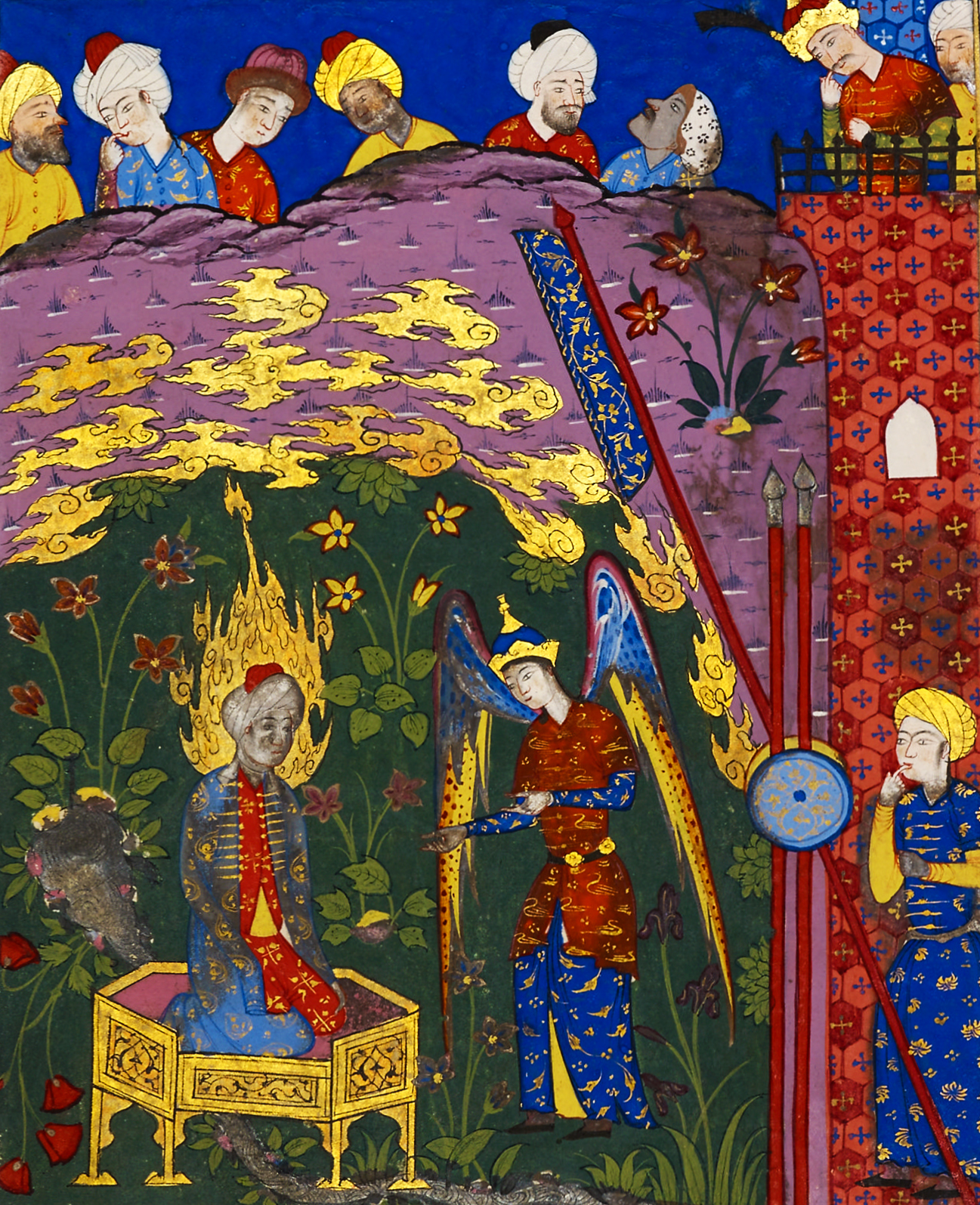
Islamic miniature of the angel Gabriel protecting Abraham from Nimrod's fire.

Terah was an idol manufacturer who once went away and left Abraham in charge of the store. A man walked in and wished to buy an idol. Abraham asked him how old he was and the man responded "50 years old". Abraham then said, "You are 50 years old and would worship a day old statue!" At this point the man left, ashamed.

Later, a woman walked into the store and wanted to make an offering to the idols. So Abraham took a stick, smashed the idols and placed the stick in the hand of the largest idol. When Terah returned, he asked Abraham what happened to all the idols. Abraham told him that a woman came in to make an offering to the idols. The idols argued about which one should eat the offering first, then the largest idol took the stick and smashed all the other idols. Terah responded by saying that they are only statues and have no knowledge. Whereupon Abraham responded by saying that you deny their knowledge, yet you worship them! At this point, Terah took Abraham to Nimrod.

Nimrod proclaims to Abraham that we should worship fire. Abraham responds that water puts out fire. So Nimrod declares they worship water. Abraham responds that clouds hold water. So Nimrod declares they worship clouds. Abraham responds that wind pushes clouds. So Nimrod declares they worship wind. Abraham responds that people withstand wind.

Nimrod becomes angry with Abraham and declares that Abraham shall be cast into the fire, and if Abraham is correct, i.e. that there is a real God, then that God will save him. Abraham is cast into the fire and is saved by God.

Abraham's brother Haran sees what happened and says that he believes in the God of Abraham. Haran is thrown into the fire, and is not saved by God. Hence the verse in Genesis 11:28, "And Haran died in the presence of his father Terah in the land of his nativity, in Ur of the Chaldees."

The Midrash is not the only mention of this story—the Quran discusses the story in great detail as well.

== Discussions relating to the Midrash ==
There are several different ways in which this Midrash has been discussed. This Midrash can be interpreted as an example of persecution against those of monotheistic beliefs during a time when polytheism dominated.

The Midrash has also been discussed in the contexts of complete, unquestioned faith. This comes from the idea that Abraham did not need proof of God before being cast into the fire, which is why God saved him. On the other hand, Haran needed to see that Abraham would be saved by God before believing, and because of this, Haran was not saved from the fire by God.

The Midrash is also used by James Kugel, the chair of the Institute for the History of the Jewish Bible at Bar Ilan University in Israel, in his book The Bible As It Was, published in 1997 by Harvard University, to look at how stories from the Bible have been changed to how they are taught in the modern day. His analysis deals with how in modern times, Abraham came to be seen as the only monotheist. Kugel's interpretation continues in the tradition of looking at this midrash as part of the analysis of monotheism.
