= Plutus =

Greek god of wealth

- God of wealth
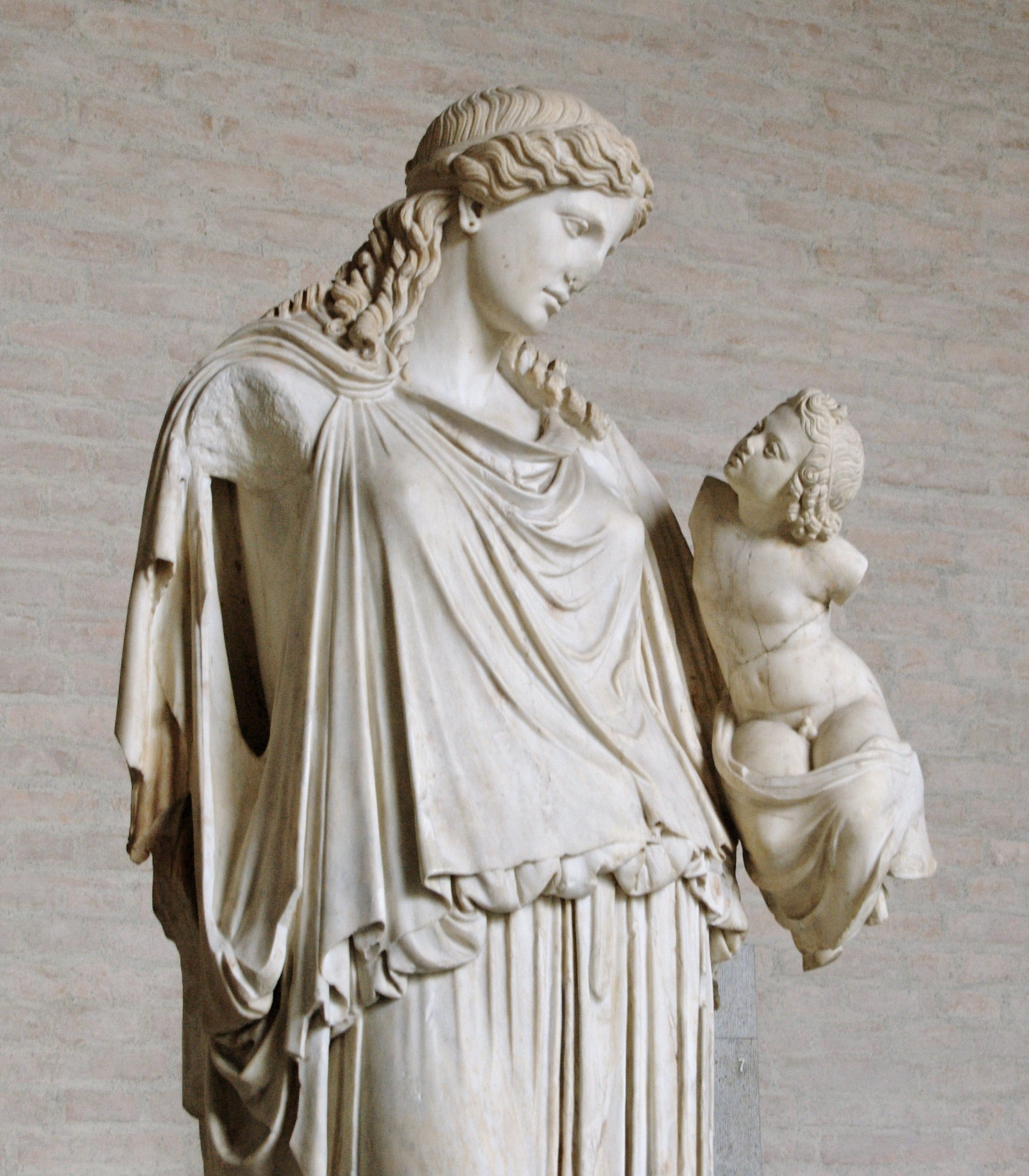
- Eirene with the infant Plutus: Roman copy after Kephisodotos' votive statue, c. 370 BC, in the Agora, Athens.
- Symbols: Cornucopia

Genealogy
- Parents: Demeter and Iasion or Tyche
- Siblings: Philomelus, Persephone, Despoina, Arion, Eubuleus, Iacchus

In ancient Greek religion and mythology, Plutus (/ˈpluːtəs/; Ancient Greek: Πλοῦτος, romanized: Ploûtos, lit. 'wealth') is the god and the personification of wealth, and the son of the goddess of agriculture Demeter and the mortal Iasion.

== Family ==
Plutus is most commonly the son of Demeter and Iasion, with whom she lay in a thrice-ploughed field. He is alternatively the son of the fortune goddess Tyche.

Two ancient depictions of Plutus, one of him as a little boy standing with a cornucopia before Demeter, and another inside the cornucopia being handed to Demeter by a goddess rising out of the earth, perhaps implying that he had been born in the Underworld, were interpreted by Karl Kerenyi to mean that Plutus was supposed to be the son of Hades and Persephone, the king and the queen of the Underworld, though no such version is attested in any primary source.

== In the arts ==
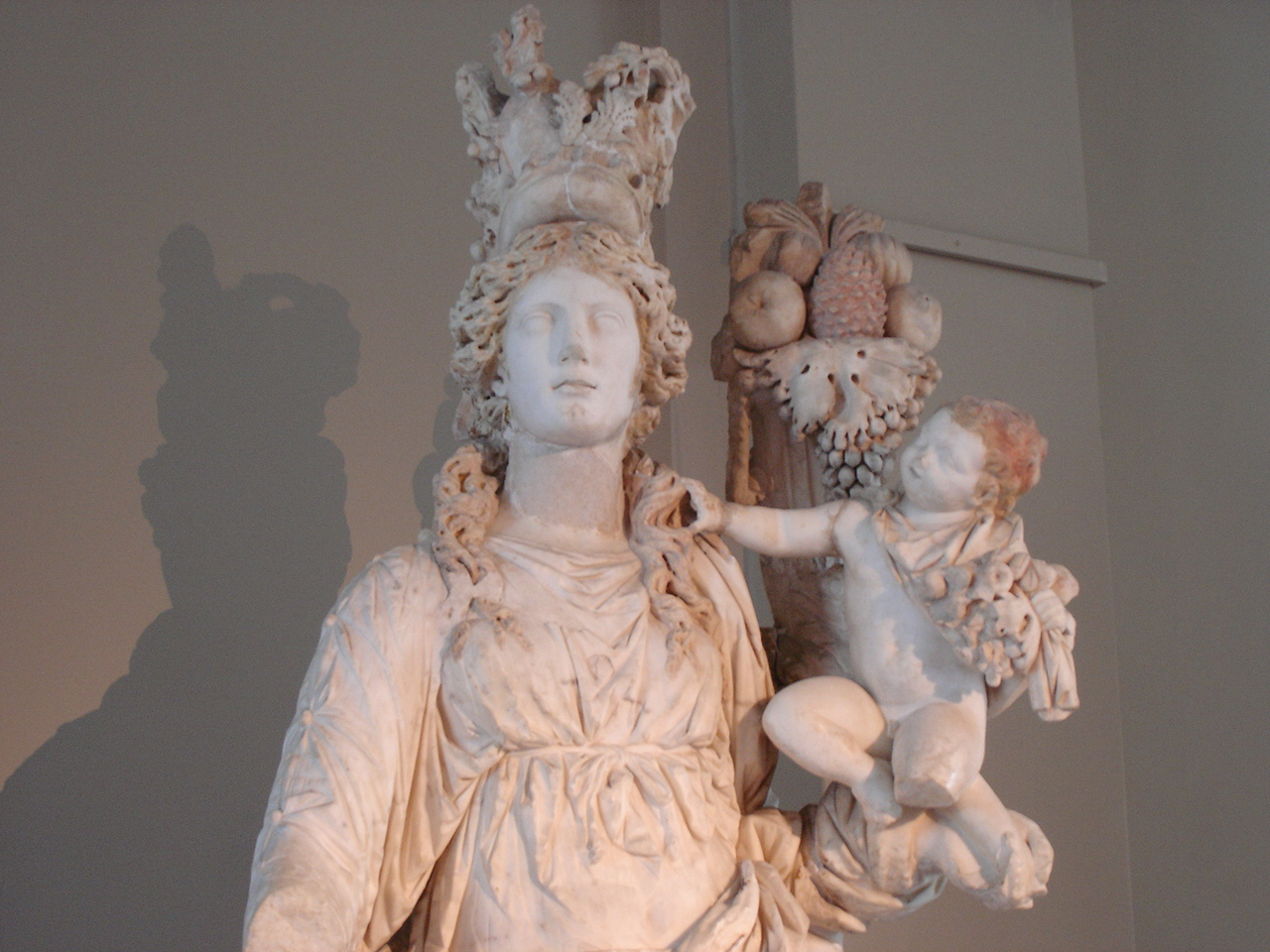
Polychrome marble statue depicting the goddess Tyche holding the infant Plutus in her arms, 2nd century AD, Istanbul Archaeological Museum.

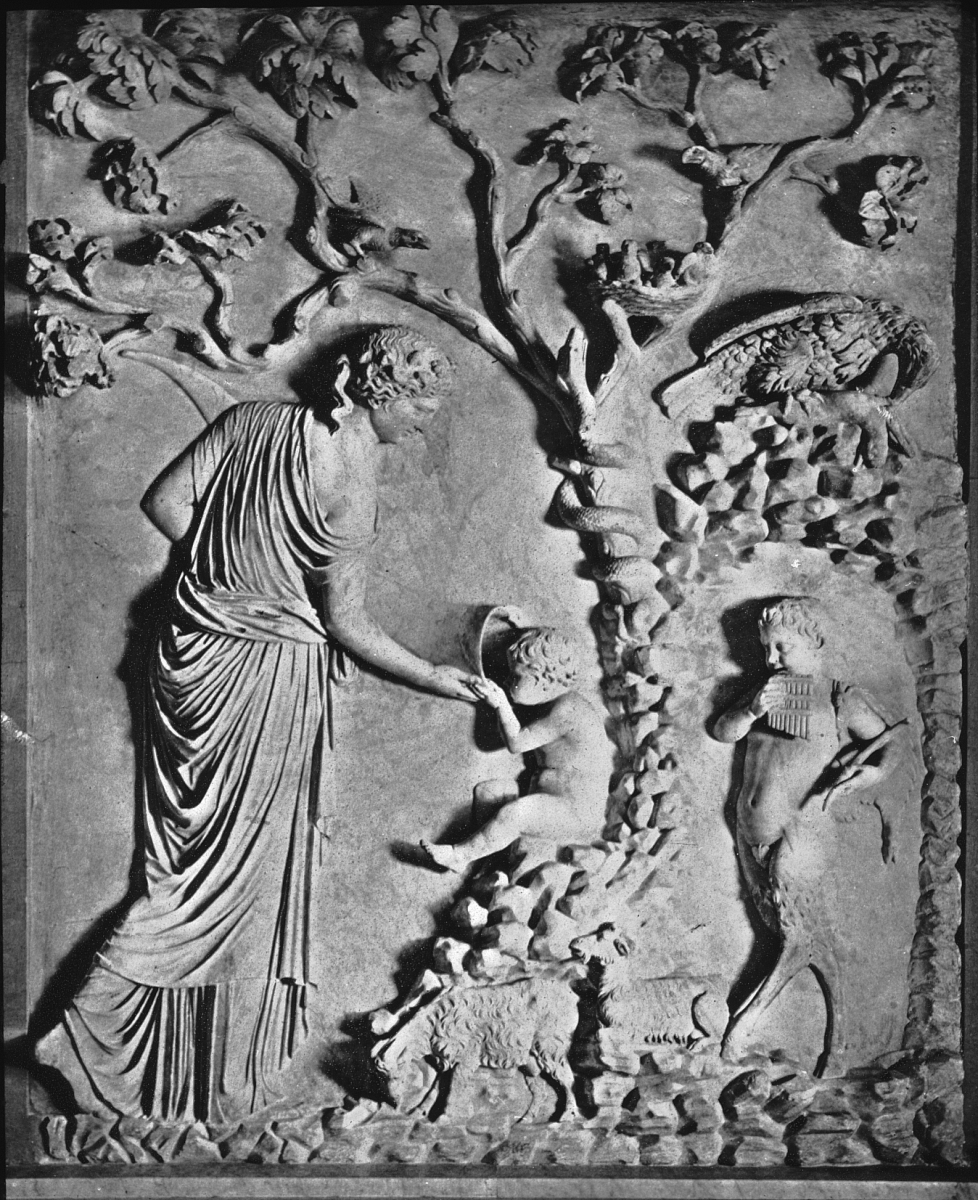
Sencathea [?] [Female figure] feeding infant Plutus from horn of plenty, relief, Rome. Brooklyn Museum Archives, Goodyear Archival Collection.

In the philosophized mythology of the later Classical period, Plutus is envisaged by Aristophanes as blinded by Zeus, so that he would be able to dispense his gifts without prejudice; he is also lame, as he takes his time arriving, and winged, so he leaves faster than he came. When the god's sight is restored, in Aristophanes' comedy, he is then able to determine who is deserving of wealth, creating havoc.

Phaedrus records a fable where, after Hercules is received in Olympus, he greets all the gods but refuses to greet Plutus. When the king of gods Jupiter asks him why, he replies that he hates the god of riches due to Plutus favouring the wicked and the corrupt.

Among the Eleusinian figures painted on Greek ceramics, regardless of whether he is depicted as child or youthful ephebe, Plutus can be identified as the one bearing the cornucopia—horn of plenty. In later allegorical bas-reliefs, Plutus is depicted as a boy in the arms of Eirene, as Prosperity is the gift of "Peace", or in the arms of Tyche, the Fortune of Cities.

In Lucian of Samosata's satirical dialogue Timon, Plutus, the very embodiment of worldly goods written in a parchment will, says to Hermes:

it is not Zeus who sends me, but Hades, who has his own ways of conferring wealth and making presents; Hades and Plutus are not unconnected, you see. When I am to flit from one house to another, they lay me on parchment, seal me up carefully, make a parcel of me and take me round. The dead man lies in some dark corner, shrouded from the knees upward in an old sheet, with the cats fighting for possession of him, while those who have expectations wait for me in the public place, gaping as wide as young swallows that scream for their mother's return.

In Canto VII of Dante's Inferno, Plutus is a demon of wealth who guards the fourth circle of Hell, "The Hoarders and the Wasters". Dante likely included Plutus to symbolize the evil of hoarding wealth. He is known for saying the famous phrase, "Pape Satàn, pape Satàn aleppe."

In addition, Erasmus writes in The Praise of Folly that Folly is the offspring of Plutus.

== Etymology ==
Like many other figures in Greek and Roman mythology, Plutus' name is related to several English words. These include:

- Plutocracy, rule by the wealthy, and plutocrat, one who rules by virtue of wealth
- Plutonomics, the study of wealth management
- Plutolatry, the "worship" of money
- Plutomania, an excessive desire for wealth

== See also ==
- Chrysus
- Kubera
- Mammon
- Ploutonion
- Pluto (mythology)
