= Reginaldo degli Scrovegni =

Reginaldo degli Scrovegni was a Paduan nobleman of the Guelph faction who lived in the 13th century just before the time of Giotto and Dante. He is best known for being cited as a usurer by Dante in the Divine Comedy, and to be the father of Enrico degli Scrovegni, who commissioned the famous Arena Chapel painted by Giotto.

== Place in Dante's Inferno ==
In Dante Alighieri’s Divine Comedy poem Inferno, Dante says that he saw Reginaldo in the inner ring of the Seventh Circle of Hell, where the violent are eternally punished. The inner ring of the Seventh Circle is a burning hot desert with a continual rain of fire. The usurers are to be found sitting on the sand, swatting away fire like animals swat bugs, and crying. Around their necks are found purses emblazoned with their coats of arms. This, and a bit of research into Dante's time-period, make it possible to identify who the suffering sinners are meant to be.

Usurers are considered violent because, as Dante's Virgil explains in Canto XI, usurers sin against Art, and Art is the Grandchild of God.

== Relevant lines from "The Inferno" Canto XVII with explanations (Mandelbaum translation) ==
So I went on alone and even farther (43)
Along the seventh circle’s outer margin,
To where the melancholy people sat.

Despondency was bursting from their eyes; (46)
This side, then that, their hands kept fending off,
At times the flames, at times the burning soil:

Not otherwise do dogs in summer-now (49)
With muzzle, now with paw-when they are bitten
By fleas or gnats or by the sharp gadfly.

When I had set my eyes upon the faces (52)
Of some on who the painful fire falls,
I recognized no one; but I did notice

That from the neck of each a purse was hung (55)
That had a special color or an emblem,
And their eyes seemed to feast upon these pouches.

Looking about-when I had come among them- (58)
I saw a yellow purse with azure on it
That had the face and manner of a lion.

Then, as I let my eyes move further on, (61)
I saw another purse that was bloodred,
And it displayed a goose more white than butter.

And one who had an azure, pregnant sow (This person is Reginaldo, because a sow azure on a field argent is the coat of arms of the Scrovegni family.)
Inscribed as emblem on his white pouch, said
To me: “What are you doing in this pit?

Now be off; and since you’re still alive, (67)
Remember that my neighbor Vitaliano
Shall yet sit here, upon my left hand side.

Among these Florentines, I’m Paduan; (70)
I often hear them thunder in my ears,
Shouting, ‘Now let the sovereign cavalier,

The one who’ll bring the purse with three goats, come!’” (73)
At this he slewed his mouth, and then he stuck
His tongue out, like an ox that licks his nose.

== Citations ==
Eimerl, Sarel (1967). The World of Giotto. New York: Time Inc. pp. 109.

Ciardi, John; Dante Alighieri (1954). The Inferno (Translators Notes). London, England: New American Library. pp. 154–155.

Dante, Alighieri (1980). The Divine Comedy. Translated by Allen Mendelbaum. Germany: Alfred A. Knopf. pp. 130–131.
