= Vitalian =

Vitalian or Vitalianus may refer to:

- Vitalian (consul) (died 520), Byzantine general and rebel
- Pope Vitalian, bishop of Rome (r. 657–672), venerated as a saint
- Vitalian of Capua (died c. 699), bishop, venerated as a saint

== See also ==
- Vitaliano
