= Ronzano =

Ronzano is a suburban district of Bologna, Italy on a hill 3 kilometers (1.9 mi) west-southwest of the city centre. It is notable for its hermitage.

In 1848 G. Dozza discovered Etruscan artefacts on the Ronzano hill. These included some bronzes; a sword, with broken blade and handle; two bridlebits, with small figures of horses; and a fragment of a fusiform and hatted rod.

The monastery was founded by the Knights of Saint Mary in 1233 on the site of a chapel built in 1209 and expanded by the Canonesses of Saint Augustine of the Congregation of Saint Mark. This convent was the place where Diana Andalò first became a nun in 1220 before being removed forcibly by her family. Her brother Loderingo Andalò, helped establish the monastery, and died there in 1293. The present building was built on the earlier foundations in the late fifteenth century. The church contains frescoes dating from the early sixteenth century. It is not to be confused with the Santa Maria di Ronzano church in the province of Teramo.

The village is the home of the figurative painter Hermann Albert.

It has been identified as the site of the Giuseppe Levi and Victor A McKusick Euro-Mediterranean Institute for Genetics and Medicine, which is the subject of a fundraising project started by the European Genetics Foundation on May 13, 2005.

Latitude: 42.5500 (42° 32' 60N) Longitude: 13.7167 (13° 43' 0E) Altitude: 326 meters (1072 feet)
