= Vitaliano di Iacopo Vitaliani =

Vitaliano di Iacopo Vitaliani was a Paduan nobleman who lived in the late 13th century around the time of Giotto and Dante. He is best known for being a wicked usurer according to Dante in the Divine Comedy.

== Place in Dante's Inferno ==
In Dante Alighieri's Divine Comedy poem Inferno, Dante says that he saw Vitaliano in the inner ring of the Seventh Circle of Hell, where the violent are eternally punished. The inner ring of the Seventh Circle is a burning hot desert with a continual rain of fire. The usurers are to be found sitting on the sand, swatting away fire the way that animals swat bugs, and crying. Vitaliano is the only usurious sinner to be named. However, around the necks of the other usurious sinners are found purses emblazoned with their family coat of arms. This, and a bit of research into Dante's time period, make it possible to identify who the suffering sinners are meant to be.

Usurers are considered violent because, as Dante's Virgil explains in Canto XI, usurers sin against Art, and Art is the Grandchild of God.

== Relevant lines from The Inferno with explanations (Mandelbaum translation) ==
So I went on alone and even farther (43)

along the seventh circle's outer margin,

to where the melancholy people sat.

Despondency was bursting from their eyes; (46)

this side, then that, their hands kept fending off,

at times the flames, at times the burning soil:

Not otherwise do dogs in summer-now (49)

with muzzle, now with paw-when they are bitten

by fleas or gnats or by the sharp gadfly.

When I had set my eyes upon the faces (52)

of some on who the painful fire falls,

I recognized no one; but I did notice

That from the neck of each a purse was hung (55)

that had a special color or an emblem,

and their eyes seemed to feast upon these pouches.

Looking about-when I had come among them- (58)

I saw a yellow purse with azure on it

that had the face and manner of a lion.

Then, as I let my eyes move further on, (61)

I saw another purse that was blood-red,

and it displayed a goose more white than butter.

And one who had an azure, pregnant sow (64)

inscribed as emblem on his white pouch, said

io me: "What are you doing in this pit?

Now be off; and since you're still alive, (67)

remember that my neighbor Vitaliano

shall yet sit here, upon my left hand side.

Among these Florentines, I'm Paduan; (70)

I often hear them thunder in my ears,

shouting, 'Now let the sovereign cavalier,

The one who'll bring the purse with three goats, come!'" (73)

At this he slewed his mouth, and then he stuck

his tongue out, like an ox that licks his nose.

== Citations ==
Ciardi, John; Dante Alighieri (1954). The Inferno (Translators Notes). London, England: New American Library. pp. 134–135.

Dante, Alighieri (1980). The Divine Comedy. Translated by Allen Mendelbaum. Germany: Alfred A. Knopf. pp. 130–131.
