= Vitaliano =

Vitaliano is a given name. Notable people with the name include:

- Vitaliano Aguirre II (born 1946), Filipino lawyer
- Vitaliano Brancati (1907–1954), Italian novelist, dramatist, poet and screenwriter
- Vitaliano Donati (1717–1762), Italian medical doctor, archeologist and botanist
- Vitaliano Poselli (1840–1918), Italian architect
- Vitaliano Trevisan (1960–2022), Italian writer, playwright and actor
- Vitaliano Visconti (1618–1671), Italian cardinal and archbishop
- Vitaliano di Iacopo Vitaliani (late 13th century), Paduan nobleman

== See also ==
- Vitalian
- Vitaliano Borromeo
