= Padua Crucifix =

Crucifix painted by Giotto

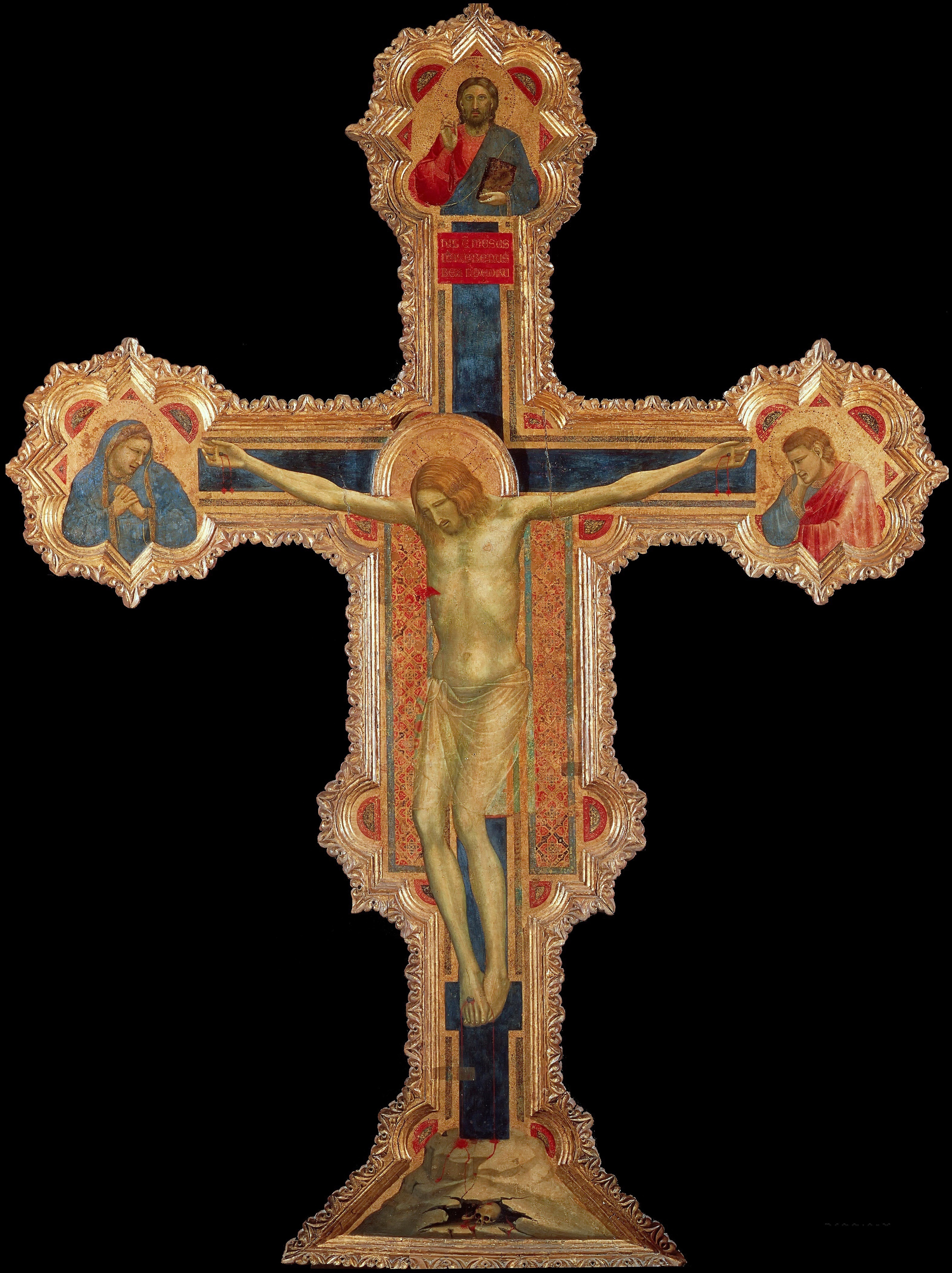
Padua Crucifix (c. 1300-1305)

The Padua Crucifix (Italian: Crocifisso di Padova) is a painting in tempera on poplar panel by Giotto of c. 1303–1305. Originally hanging in the centre of the Scrovegni Chapel in Padua, above the latticework of the iconostasis, it was probably contemporaneous with his frescoes in the same chapel. It now hangs in the Musei degli Eremitani in Padua.

The crucifix was first attributed to Giotto in 1864 by Cavalcaselle; that attribution was initially contested by other art critics such as Rintelen, Weigeit and Brandi due to the work's poor condition at that time, but following restoration it is now accepted as a work by Giotto.
