= Giuliano Pisani =

Giuliano Pisani is a writer, classical philologist, scholar of ancient Greek and Latin literature, and art historian who was born on April 13, 1950, in Verona, Italy. He graduated with a degree in ancient Greek history from Padua University with Professor Franco Sartori. He was a full professor of Greek and Latin literature at Liceo Tito Livio in Padua. Since 2011, he has been a member of the National Italian Committee of the Promoters of Classical Culture at MIUR (Ministry of Education, University and Research). He was also the technical coordinator of the first Olympiad in Classical Languages and Civilizations, which was held in Venice (25-27 May 2012).

His scholarly interests are mainly centered on philosophy and ethics. His work includes translations and studies of Plato, Plutarch (in particular Moralia, the ethic writings about the soul care, education and policy), and Marsilio Ficino.

He has received prestigious many prizes and acknowledgments for his work. In 1990, he won the Monselice Award Leone Traverso for his Greek translation of Plutarch's Moralia. In 1999, he won the Marcello d'Olivo Award of the city of Lignano (Humanities section). In 2000, he won the Francesco Petrarca Award of the Euganean Academy of Sciences, Literature and Arts. In 2009, he won the Bookseller's Prize of the city of Padua with his book about Giotto's frescoes in the Arena Chapel. In 2010, he won the Caorle Mare Award for Culture.

For his cultural merits in 1991, he was elected member of the Société Européenne de Culture, and since 1996, he has been a member of Lorenzo Valla foundation.

From 1983 to 1988, he has been the Secretary, and since 1988, he has been the President, of the Italian Association for Classical Culture, Padua's Delegation.

An active cultural promoter, in 1994, he created the Premio Campiello Giovani on the model of the Premio Campiello.

In 2001, he created with Virginia Baradel the Gemine Muse European format .

In 1995, he created a cycle of lectures devoted the theme of Philosophy as Therapy, which he has organized and directed ever since.

Since 1999, he has worked on the creation in Padua of the Giardino dei Giusti del Mondo (the Garden of the Righteous of the World), which was inaugurated on October 5, 2008, and honors those who made a stand against the genocide of the last century..

== Plutarch' studies ==
• Edition, with Greek text, Italian translation, introduction and notes of Moralia

Moralia I - «La serenità interiore» e altri testi sulla terapia dell'anima, La Biblioteca dell'Immagine, Pordenone 1989, pp. LIX-508 1989, pp. LIX-508 (De tranquillitate animi; De virtute et vitio; De virtute morali; An virtus doceri possit; Quomodo quis suos in virtute sentiat profectus; Animine an corporis affectiones sint peiores; De vitioso pudore; De cohibenda ira; De garrulitate; De curiositate; De invidia et odio; De cupiditate divitiarum)

Moralia II - L'educazione dei ragazzi, La Biblioteca dell'Immagine, Pordenone, 1990, pp. XXXVIII-451 (De liberis educandis; Quomodo adolescens poetas audire debeat; De recta ratione audiendi; De musica, in collaboration with Leo Citelli)

Moralia III - Etica e politica, La Biblioteca dell'Immagine, Pordenone 1992, pp. XLIII-490 (Praecepta gerendae rei publicae; An seni sit gerenda res publica; De capienda ex inimicis utilitate; De se ipsum citra invidiam laudando; Maxime cum principibus philosopho esse disserendum; Ad principem ineruditum; De unius in republica dominatione, populari statu et paucorum imperio; De exilio)

• Plutarco, Vite di Lisandro e Silla, Fondazione Lorenzo Valla, 1997 (in collaboration with Maria Gabriella Angeli Bertinelli, Mario Manfredini, Luigi Piccirilli)

• For the Mondadori Oscar he published the following texts:

• Consigli politici, 1994, pp. V-XL, 1-148 • La serenità interiore, 1995, pp. 1–95 • L'arte di ascoltare, 1995, pp. 1–90 • Come educare i figli, 1996, pp. 1–127. • Come trarre vantaggio dai nemici, 1996, pp. 1–89

Nel 2017 per la collana Il pensiero occidentale della Bompiani ha coordinato con Emanuele Lelli l'edizione bilingue integrale in un unico volume dei Moralia: (GRC, IT) Plutarco, "Tutti i Moralia", prima traduzione italiana completa, Milano, Bompiani, 2017 (ISBN 978-88-452-9281-1).

== Arena Chapel's studies ==
• I volti segreti di Giotto. Le rivelazioni della Cappella degli Scrovegni, Rizzoli, Milano 2008. ISBN 978-88-17-02722-9

“A wonderful intellectual adventure into the core of Giotto's inspiration and the amazing world of the Italian 14th century” (Antonia Arslan) This book is a journey into the symbolic universe of the painter who revolutionized the concept of space. The 14th century in Italy begins with the creation of two masterpieces: the first part of Dante's Divine Comedy, devoted to Hell, and the fresco cycle of the Scrovegni Chapel or Arena Chapel(1303–1305), both works marking the start of a new era. There are works that never stop challenging our minds; works that are not forgotten with the passing of time. In his book Giuliano Pisani takes us into the heart of one of the great masterpieces of Western art: the symbol-laden frescoes of the Scrovegni Chapel. The book is a journey of discovery aimed at finding out again the pieces of a mosaic whose original meaning had been lost; deciphering the meaning of the allegories, and correcting some commonly accepted interpretations. In his frescoes Giotto shows man's salvation, a very complex project, following the guide lines from a hitherto unknown theologian who worked in the shadow: Alberto da Padova. New figures have been identified in a fundamental point of the cycle (Christ on the throne in the picture of the Final Judgement): a centaurus, a she-bear, a pike fish finally take the place of the figures that were formerly believed to symbolise the evangelists .

• L’ispirazione filosofico-teologica nella sequenza Vizi-Virtù della Cappella degli Scrovegni, «Bollettino del Museo Civico di Padova», XCIII, 2004, Milano 2005, pp. 61–97.

• Terapia umana e divina nella Cappella degli Scrovegni, «Il Governo delle cose», dir. Franco Cardini, Firenze, n. 51, anno VI, 2006, pp. 97–106.

• L’iconologia di Cristo Giudice nella Cappella degli Scrovegni di Giotto, «Bollettino del Museo Civico di Padova», XCV, 2006, pp. 45–65.

• Le allegorie della sovrapporta laterale d’accesso alla Cappella degli Scrovegni di Giotto, «Bollettino del Museo Civico di Padova», XCV, 2006, pp. 67–77.

• Il miracolo della Cappella degli Scrovegni di Giotto, in Modernitas – Festival della modernità (Milano 22-25 giugno 2006), Spirali, Milano 2006, pp. 329–57.

• Una nuova interpretazione del ciclo giottesco agli Scrovegni, «Padova e il suo territorio», XXII, 125, 2007, pp. 4–8.

• Il programma della Cappella degli Scrovegni, in Giotto e il Trecento, a cura di A. Tomei, Skira, Milano 2009, I – I saggi, pp. 113–127.

• La Desperatio, ultimo vizio nella Cappella degli Scrovegni di Giotto, in Disperazione. Saggi sulla condizione umana tra filosofia, scienza e arte, a cura di G. F. Frigo, Mimesis, Milano 2010, pp. 209–232.

• Le iscrizioni latine sulle porte pretorie del Palazzo della Ragione di Padova, in «Padova e il suo territorio», 166, 2013, pp. 17–22.

• La fonte agostiniana della figura allegorica femminile sopra la porta palaziale della Cappella degli Scrovegni, in «Bollettino del Museo Civico di Padova», XCIX, 2010 (2014), pp. 35–46.

• La concezione agostiniana del programma teologico della Cappella degli Scrovegni, in Alberto da Padova e la cultura degli agostiniani, a cura di F. Bottin, Padova University Press 2014, pp. 216–268.

• Il capolavoro di Giotto. La Cappella degli Scrovegni, Editoriale Programma, 2015, pp. 176 (ISBN 978-88-6643-350-7) Dante e Giotto: la Commedia degli Scrovegni, in Dante fra il settecentocinquantenario della nascita (2015) e il settecentenario della morte (2021). Atti delle Celebrazioni in Senato, del Forum e del Convegno internazionale di Roma: maggio-ottobre 2015, a cura di E. Malato e A. Mazzucchi, Tomo II, Salerno Editrice, Roma 2016, pp. 799–815.

• Le passioni in Giotto, in El corazón es centro. Narraciones, representaciones y metáforas del corazón en el mundo hispánico, a cura di Antonella Cancellier, Cleup, Padova 2017, pp. 550–592.

• Giotto and Halley's Comet, From Giotto to Rosetta. 30 Years of Cometary Science from Space and Ground, ed. by Cesare Barbieri and Carlo Giacomo Someda, Accademia Galileiana di Scienze, Lettere ed Arti, Padova 2017, pp. 341–364.

• La Cappella degli Scrovegni, in Giotto. Pictor egregius, UTET Grandi Opere, Torino 2017, pp. 209–315.

• Scrovegni Chapel, in Magister Giotto, Franco Maria Ricci, Torino 2017, pp. 138–186.

• Il buon governo in Giotto, in Lingue, linguaggi e politica, a cura di Antonella Cancellier, Alessia Cassani, Luisa A. Messina Fajardo, Giovanna Scocozza, Dagmar Winkler, Cleup, Padova 2019 (ISBN 978 88 5495 085 6), pp. 53–84.

• Giuliano Pisani, La Cappella degli Scrovegni. La rivoluzione di Giotto, Skira, Milano 2021, pp. 1–176 (ISBN 978-88-572-4363-4)

• Giuliano Pisani, The Scrovegni Chapel, Giotto's Revolution, Translation by Laura Orsi, Philip Harvey and Stefan Mattessich, Skira, Milano 2021, pp. 1–176 (ISBN 978-88-572-4452-5)

• Giuliano Pisani, La Chapelle des Scrovegni. La révolution de Giotto, Traduit par Isabelle Baragan et Maurizia Dalla Volta, Skira, Milano 2021, pp. 1–176 (ISBN 978-88-572-4531-7)

• Giuliano Pisani, Die Scrovegni Kapelle. Giottos Revolution, Übersetzung von Klaus Mueller, Skira, Milano 2021, pp. 1–176 (ISBN 978-88-572-4532-4)

== Other Art History Studies ==
• Le Veneri di Raffaello (tra Anacreonte e il Magnifico, il Sodoma e Tiziano), in Studi di Storia dell'Arte, 26, Ediart, Todi, 2015, pp. 97–122.

• Archetipi liviani nella storia dell'arte, in Attualità di Tito Livio, in Atti e Memorie dell'Accademia Galileiana di Scienze, Lettere ed Arti in Padova, CXXX - Parte III, Padova 2019, pp. 199–239.

• Antonio Canova: la freccia di Amore e Psiche, in Atti e Memorie dell'Accademia Galileiana di Scienze, Lettere ed Arti in Padova, CXXX - Parte III, Padova 2019, pp. 297–317.

== Other studies ==
• First modern edition of Marsilio Ficino, De vita libri tres, in collaboration with Albano Biondi, Biblioteca dell'Immagine, Pordenone 1991, pp. XXXV-501.

• Platone, Repubblica (antologia), in collaboration with Franco Sartori, Biblioteca Filosofica Laterza, Laterza, Bari 1995, pp. 1–301
