= European Genetics Foundation =

Training organization for gene scientists

The European Genetics Foundation (EGF) is a non-profit organization, dedicated to the training of young geneticists active in medicine, to continuing education in genetics/genomics and to the promotion of public understanding of genetics. Its main office is located in Bologna, Italy.

== Background ==
In 1988 Prof. Giovanni Romeo, President of the European Genetics Foundation (EGF) and professor of Medical Genetics at the University of Bologna and Prof. Victor A. McKusick founded together the European School of Genetic Medicine (ESGM).

Since that time ESGM has taught genetics to postgraduate students (young M.D. and PhD) from some 70 countries. Most of the courses are presented at ESGM's Main Training Center (MTC) in Bertinoro di Romagna (Italy), and are also available via webcast at authorized Remote Training Centers (RTC) in various countries in Europe and the Mediterranean area (Hybrid Courses). In the Netherlands and Switzerland, medical geneticists must attend at least one ESGM course before admission to their Board examinations.

For these reasons, the School has been able to expand and to obtain funding from the European Commission and from other international organizations.

== Presentation of the Ronzano Project ==
The European School of Genetic Medicine was founded in 1988 and saw rapid success, which necessitated that an administrative body be formed. To this end the European Genetics Foundation was born in Genoa on 20 November 1995, with the following aims:

- to run the ESGM, promoting the advanced scientific and professional training of young European Geneticists, with particular attention to the applications in the field of preventive medicine;
- to promote public education about genetics discoveries;
- to organize conferences, courses, international prizes and initiatives aimed at bringing together the scientific and humanistic disciplines.

The ESGM began receiving funding from the European Union and from other international organizations including the European Society of Human Genetics, the Federation of European Biochemical Societies, the March of Dimes and UNESCO. Since its founding, the ESGM has become a model for other European institutions responsible for advanced training in genetics.

In order to fully realize all of the European Genetics Foundation's aims, the Foundation has identified a permanent site for the ESGM at the Hermitage of Ronzano, a monastery situated in the hills of Bologna, at 3.5 km from the city center and 7 km from the airport. The monastic order of the Servants of Maria, founded in Florence in 1233 and owner of the Hermitage, donated 16,000 m^{2} for the purpose of constructing this center, which will be named the Giuseppe Levi and Victor A. Mckusick Euro-Mediterranean Center for Genetics and Medicine. Giuseppe Levi, a scientist, trained three Nobel Laureates (Salvador Luria, Renato Dulbecco and Rita Levi-Montalcini), and Victor A. McKusick is considered the father of medical genetics throughout the world.

The European Genetics Foundation envisions the Ronzano Center as a venue for advanced training, and as a think tank where experts in genetics and related disciplines from all over the world can discuss issues of scientific, social, and political relevance, and to develop problem-solving strategies to address these issues.

The new center will host:

- the European School of Genetic Medicine (ESGM)
- a European observatory for the legislation regarding genetic testing and policy regarding genetics research
- advanced scientific courses outside of the area of Genetics, geared toward scientist from developing countries
- a residential center in which Professors and students can live during residential courses
- the Federation of the Association for Rare Diseases of Emilia-Romagna. (GIG, Genetic Interest Groups)
- various projects to diffuse information about genetics to the public.
