= Enrico degli Scrovegni =

Italian moneylender and patron of Giotto (died 1336)

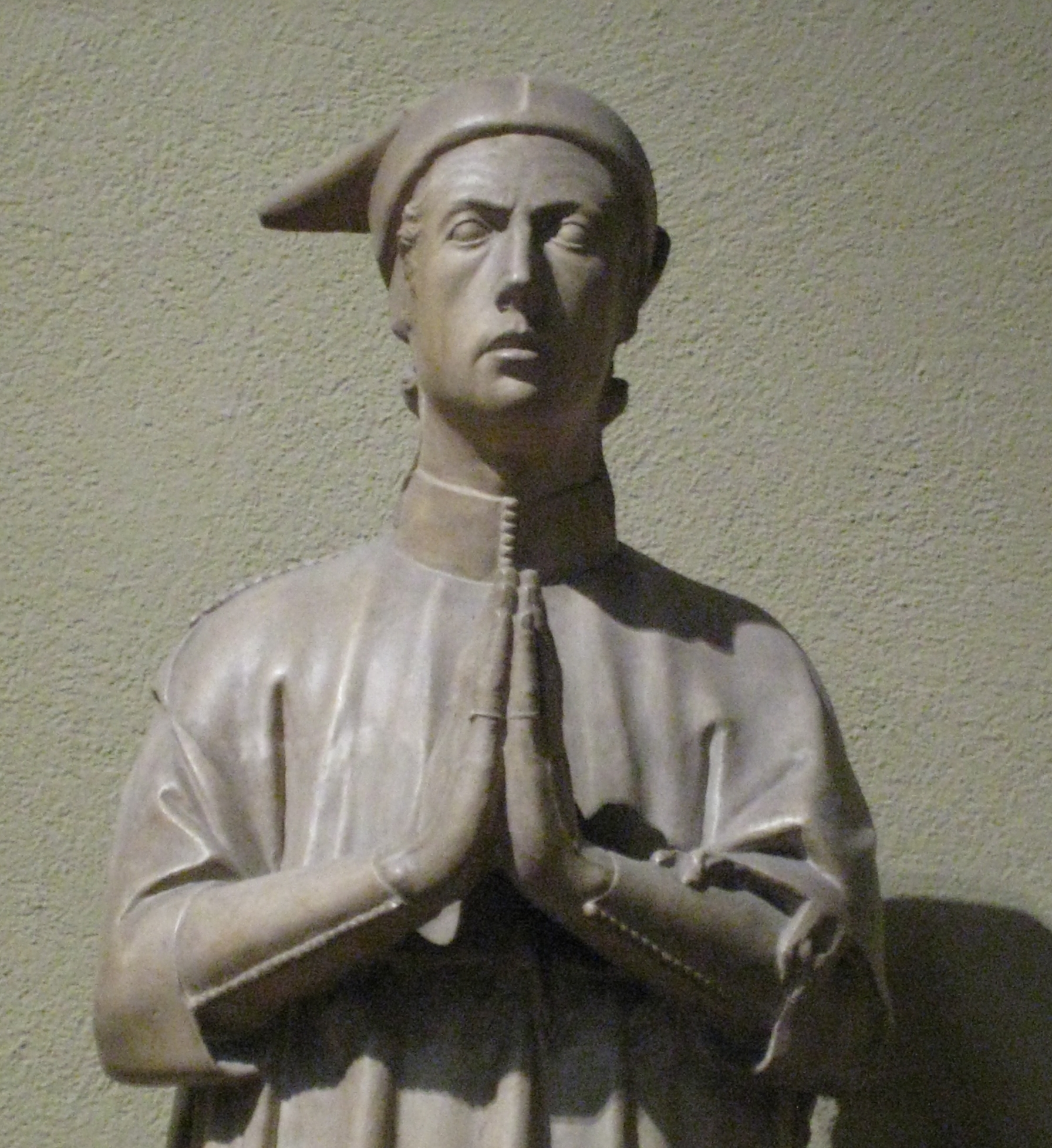
Plaster cast of a portrait sculpture of Enrico Scrovegni, by Marco Romano, 1317–1320, in the sacristy of the Scrovegni Chapel, Padua

Enrico Scrovegni (died 1336) was a Paduan money lender who lived around the time of Giotto and Dante. He was the son of Reginaldo degli Scrovegni and Capellina Malacapelli, and was married twice, first to a member of the Carrara family, then to Jacopina (Giacomina) d'Este, daughter of Francesco d'Este, Marquis of Ferrara. He may have been a member of the Cavalieri Gaudenti.

Enrico is most famous as the patron of Giotto, commissioning the great painter to paint the famous Scrovegni Chapel, c. 1303-5, which he also commissioned. There is a tradition that he hired Giotto to atone for the sin of usury, although there is debate about whether this idea has any foundation. Dante placed his father in the Seventh Circle of Hell for his notoriously ill-gotten gains, and Enrico himself was a moneylender on a grand scale. Against the idea that he founded the chapel as an act of atonement may be cited the fact that it was a very sumptuous commission for his own personal use, attached to the grand palace that he built for himself. In 1320 Enrico Scrovegni fled the wars and civil strife that plagued Padua at the time, and settled in Venice. He was formally banished from Padua in 1328, and died in Venice in 1336.
