= Loderingo degli Andalò =

Loderingo degli Andalò (1210–1293) was an Italian nobleman from a Bolognese Ghibelline family. He held many important civic positions and founded the Knights of Saint Mary (also known as the Order of the glorious Saint Mary or Jovial Friars (Frati Gaudenti, in Latin)) in 1261. Loderingo was the brother of Diana, who founded the Dominican Monastery of Saint Agnes. He was governor of Modena in 1251, and, with Catalano dei Malavolti, shared the position of governor of Bologna in 1265, of Florence in 1266, and of Bologna again in 1267. The Order was founded in 1261, when Pope Urban IV approved its rule in the bull Sol ille verus of 23 December 1261. The Order, which was approved by Pope Alexander IV in 1261, was the first religious order of knighthood to grant the rank of 'militissa' to women who were the daughter, spouse or widow of a Knight. Its mission was to promote peace between warring municipal factions, but its members soon succumbed to self-interest and it was suppressed by Sixtus V in 1558.

In 1267 he joined the Jovial Friars' monastery that he had founded at Ronzano where he stayed until his death.

In Dante Alighieri's Inferno (of the Divine Comedy), he is found among the hypocrites in the Eighth Circle of Hell. Loderingo is extolled for his fortitude in dying by his friend the poet Guittone d'Arezzo.

He is also known as Loderingo degli Andalò, Loderingo d'Andalò, and Loderigo d'Andalo.
