= Order of the Blessed Virgin Mary =

Military order (1261–1558)

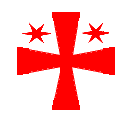
The emblem of the Military Order of the Blessed Virgin Mary

The Order of the Blessed Virgin Mary (Italian: Frati della Beata Gloriosa Vergine Maria; Latin: Ordo Militiae Mariae Gloriosae), also called the Order of Saint Mary of the Tower or the Order of the Knights of the Mother of God, commonly the Knights of Saint Mary, was a military order founded in 1261. The order received its rule from Pope Urban IV, who expressly states the purpose of the organisation and the rights and obligations of its members:

[The members of the order] are to be allowed to bear arms for the defence of the catholic faith and ecclesiastical freedom, when specifically required to do so by the Roman church. For subduing civil discords they may carry only defensive weapons, provided they have the permission of the diocesan.

The rule of the order was based on that of the Augustinians, but allowed members to marry and eschew communal poverty, following a precedent set by the Order of Santiago and the Militia of Jesus Christ. Their chief task appears to have been the pacification of the Lombard cities, racked by factional strife. However, they were largely unsuccessful, partly due to their political allegiance with the Church. The unique position of the order and the nature of its rule has led to its being denied full status by historians, who have sometimes labelled it a mere confraternity. The order would admit a woman as a militissa (female knight).

The order did have some success at building bridges between the Guelphs and Ghibellines. Two founding members, Loderingo degli Andalò, a Ghibelline from Bologna, and Catalano di Guido of the Catalani family of Guelphs, were given the government of Bologna in 1265 during a period of civil strife between the two factions. Though less than successful there, the two knights were appointed by Pope Clement IV the very next year (1266) to govern Florence in the aftermath of the Battle of Benevento. They gained the opprobrium of the Florentines, however, and Dante Alighieri, in his famous Inferno placed them in the eighth circle of Hell with the hypocrites, where they sing:

| Frati godenti fummo, e bolognesi; io Catalano e questi Loderingo nomati, e da tua terra insieme presi | Frati Gaudenti were we, and Bolognese; I Catalano, and he Loderingo Named, and together taken by thy city . . . |

The order gained a reputation for carelessness with respect to their vows and were labelled the fratres gaudentes (Latin) or frati (cavalieri) gaudenti (Italian): jovial (joyous, jubilant) brothers (brethren, friars). Not all later members of the order were corrupt—Enrico degli Scrovegni patronised the Scrovegni Chapel—but the order was eventually suppressed by Pope Sixtus V in 1558.

== Bibliography ==
- Crawford, Paul (2004). "Military Orders in Italy". In Kleinhenz, Christopher (ed.). Medieval Italy: An Encyclopedia. New Jersey: Routledge University Press. pp. 720–22. ISBN 0-415-93930-5.
- Forey, Alan (1992). The Military Orders: From the Twelfth to the Early Fourteenth Centuries. Toronto: University of Toronto Press. ISBN 978-0802028051.
- Vincent, Catherine (2001). "Militia of Jesus Christ". Encyclopedia of the Middle Ages. New Jersey: Routledge University Press. pp. 953–54. ISBN 1-57958-282-6.
