= Vitaliano Borromeo =

Vitaliano Borromeo may refer to:

- Vitaliano I Borromeo (died 1449), count of Arona
- Vitaliano VI Borromeo (1620–1690), marquis of Angera
- Vitaliano Borromeo (cardinal) (1720–1793)
- Vitaliano VIII Borromeo (1792-1874), marquis of Angera
