= Scrovegni Chapel =

Church in Padua, Veneto, Italy

Scrovegni Chapel (Cappella degli Scrovegni), Padua
UNESCO World Heritage Site
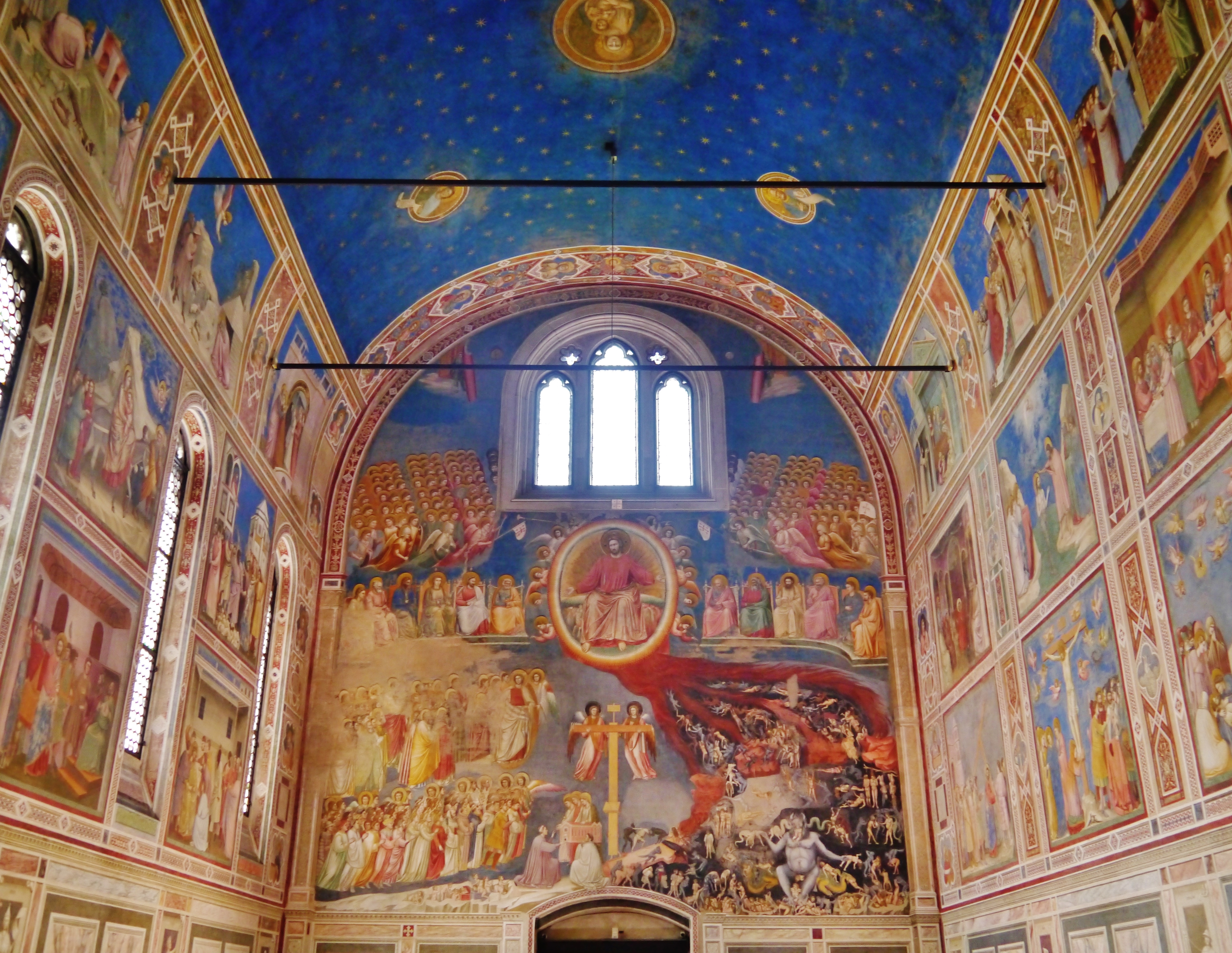
- The Last Judgment in the Scrovegni Chapel

- Location within Veneto Location within Italy
- Location: Padua, Veneto, Italy
- Criteria: Cultural: (ii), (iii)
- Reference: 1623
- Inscription: 2021 (44th Session)
- Website: www.cappelladegliscrovegni.it/index.php/en/
- Coordinates: 45°24′43″N 11°52′46″E

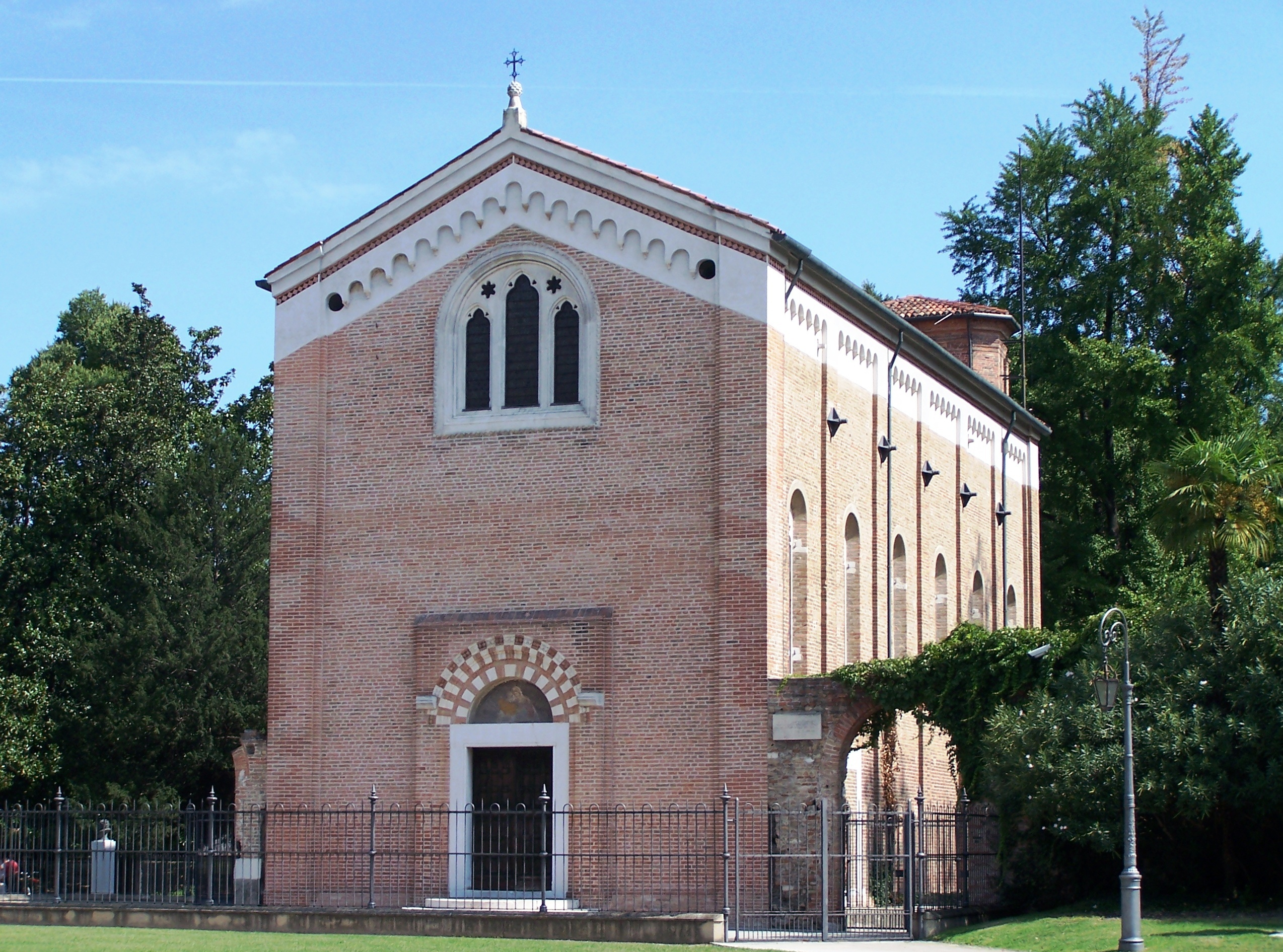
The exterior of the Scrovegni Chapel

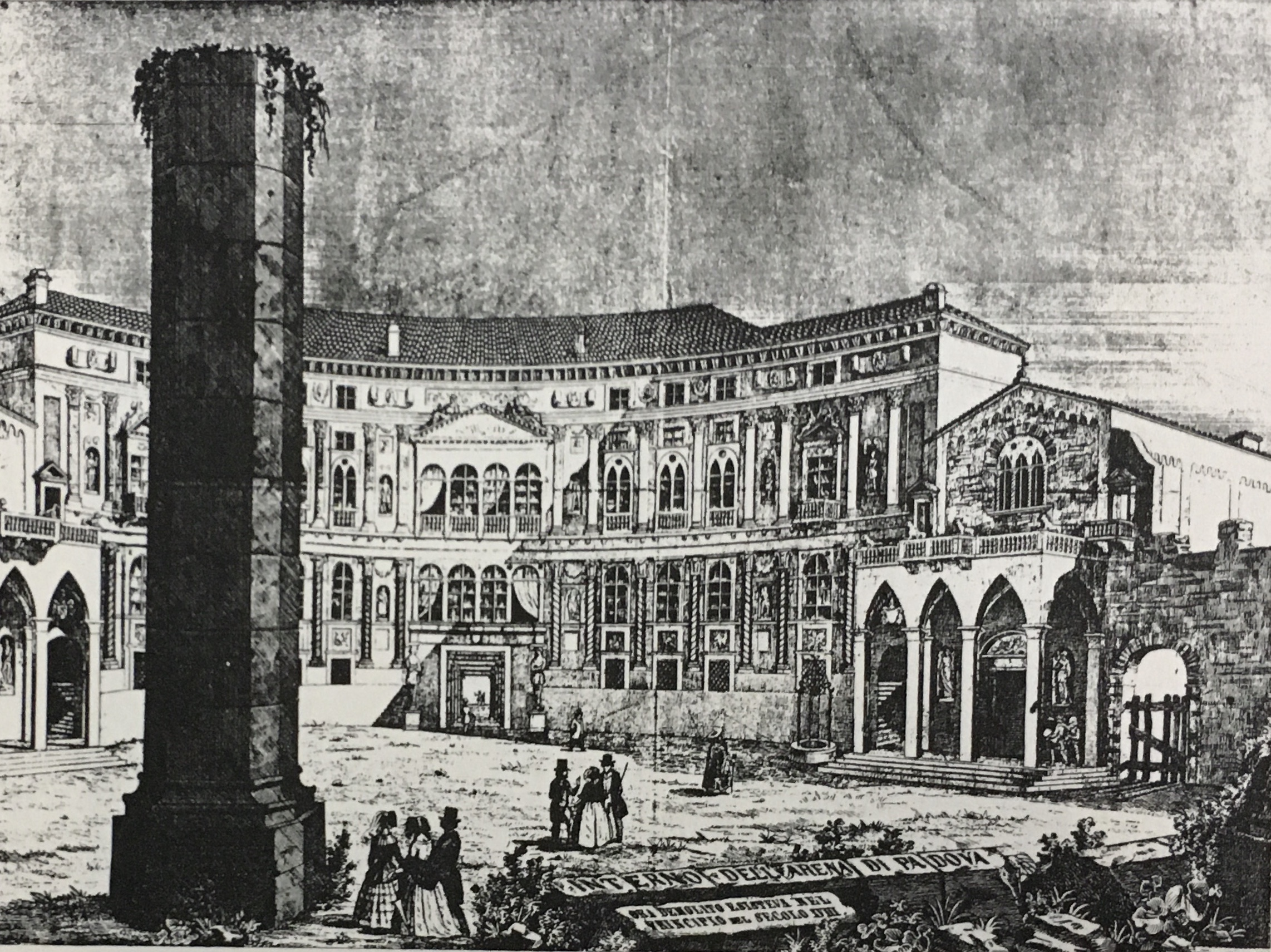
An 1842 engraving (from an earlier watercolor painting) shows the Arena Chapel to the right of an older palace, also bought, and redecorated, by Enrico Scrovegni. The palace had been demolished by 1827. (Note: Giotto's depiction of the chapel in The Last Judgment depicts the building without a portico.)

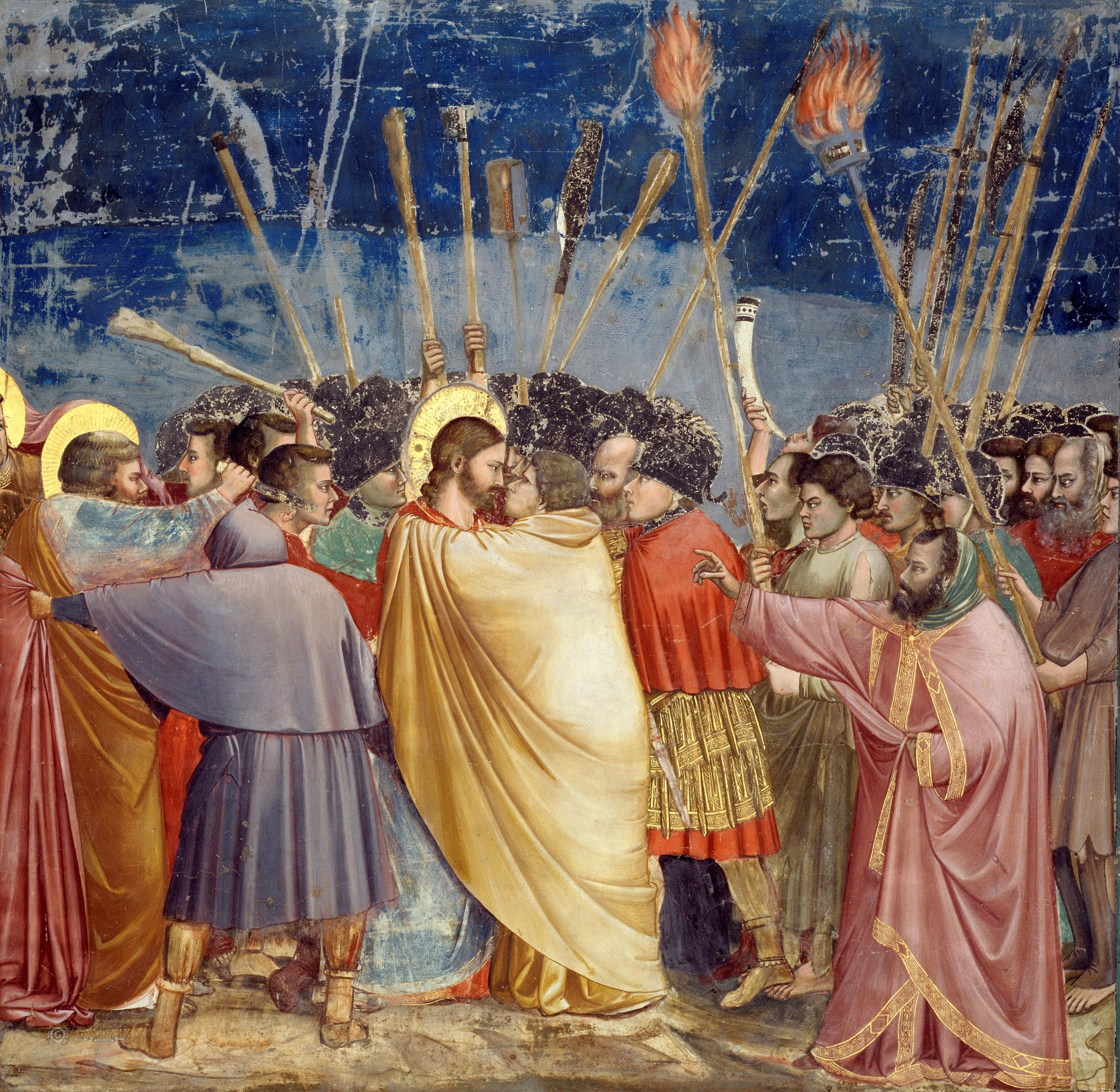
Kiss of Judas, one of the panels in the Scrovegni Chapel

The Scrovegni Chapel (Italian: Cappella degli Scrovegni [kapˈpɛlla deʎʎi skroˈveɲɲi]), also known as the Arena Chapel, is a small church, adjacent to the Augustinian monastery, the Monastero degli Eremitani in Padua, region of Veneto, Italy. The chapel and monastery are now part of the complex of the Musei Civici di Padova.

The chapel contains a fresco cycle by Giotto, completed around 1305 and an important masterpiece of Western art. In 2021, the chapel was declared part of the UNESCO World Heritage Site of 14th-century fresco cycles composed of 8 historical buildings in Padua city centre. The Scrovegni Chapel contains the most important frescoes that marked the beginning of a revolution in mural painting and influenced fresco technique, style, and content for a whole century.

== Description ==
Giotto and his team covered all the internal surfaces of the chapel with frescoes, including the walls and the ceiling. The nave is 20.88 metres (68.5 ft) long, 8.41 metres (27.6 ft) wide, and 12.65 metres (41.5 ft) high. The apse area is composed of a square area (4.49 meters deep and 4.31 meters wide) and a pentagonal area (2.57 meters deep). The largest element is extensive cycles showing the Life of Christ and the Life of the Virgin. The wall at the rear of the church, through which the chapel is entered, has a large Last Judgement. There are also panels in grisaille (monochrome) showing the Vices and Virtues.

The church was dedicated to Santa Maria della Carità at the Feast of the Annunciation, 1303, and consecrated in 1305. Much of Giotto's fresco cycle focuses on the life of the Virgin Mary and celebrates her role in human salvation. A motet by Marchetto da Padova appears to have been composed for the dedication on 25 March 1305. The chapel is also known as the Arena Chapel because it was built on land purchased by Enrico Scrovegni that abutted the site of a Roman arena. The space was where an open-air procession and sacred representation of the Annunciation to the Virgin had been played out for a generation before the chapel was built.

== History ==
=== Building and decoration ===
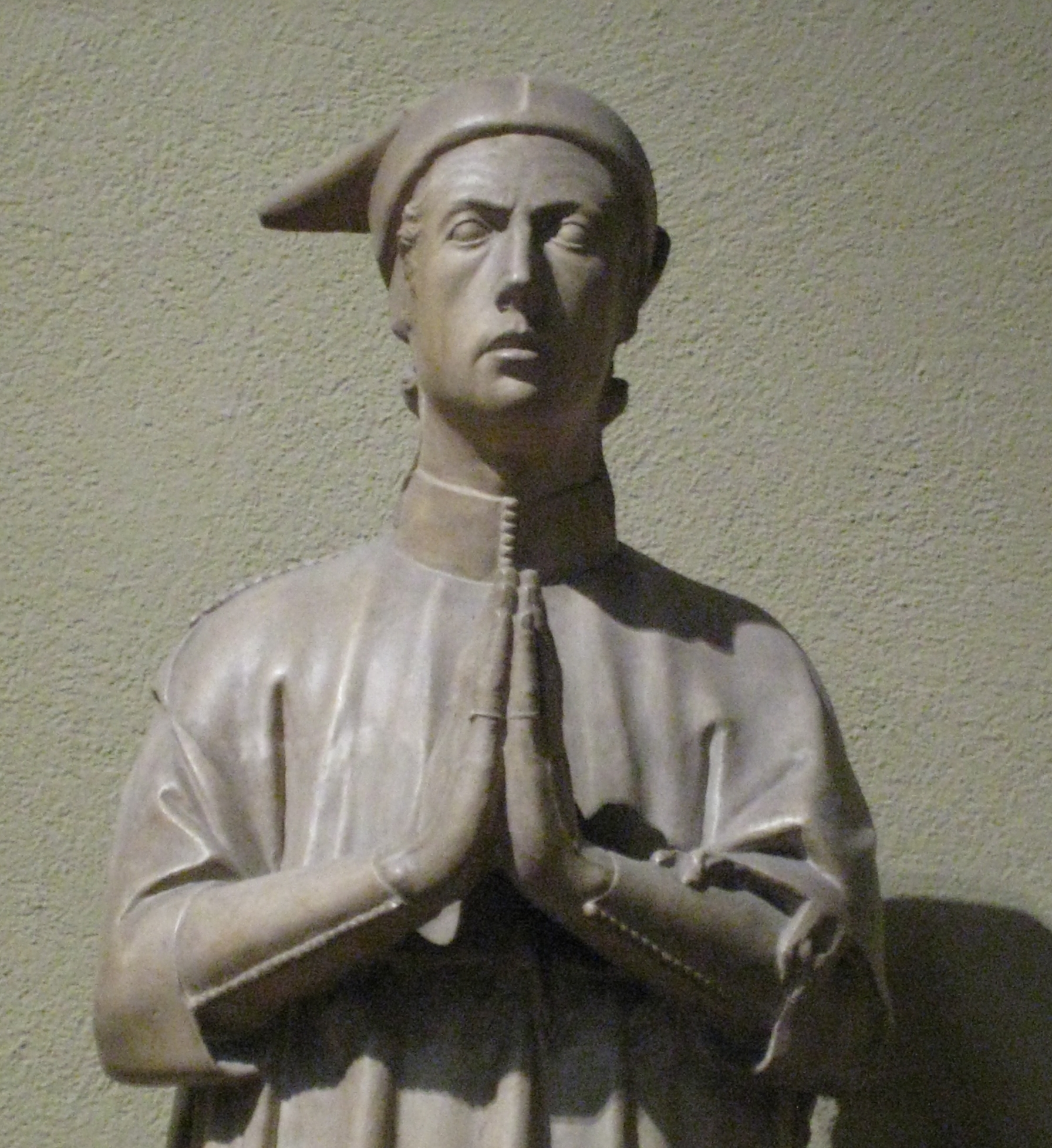
Cast of Giovanni Pisano's effigy of Enrico Scrovegni, in the chapel

The Arena Chapel was commissioned to Giotto by the affluent Paduan banker, Enrico Scrovegni. In the early 1300s Enrico purchased from Manfredo Dalesmanini the area on which the Roman arena had stood. Here he had his luxurious palace built, as well as a chapel annexed to it. The chapel's project was twofold: to serve as the family's private oratory and as a funerary monument for himself and his wife. Enrico commissioned Giotto, the famous Florentine painter, to decorate his chapel. Giotto had previously worked for the Franciscan friars in Assisi and Rimini, and had been in Padua for some time, working for the Basilica of Saint Anthony in the Sala del Capitolo and in the Blessings's Chapel.

A number of 14th-century sources (Riccobaldo Ferrarese, Francesco da Barberino, 1312–1313) testify to Giotto's presence at the Arena Chapel's site. The fresco cycle can be dated with a good approximation to a series of documentary testimonies: the purchase of the land took place on 6 February 1300; the bishop of Padua, Ottobono dei Razzi, authorised the building some time prior to 1302 (the date of his transferral to the Patriarcato of Aquileia); the chapel was first consecrated on 25 March 1303, the feast day of the Annunciation; on 1 March 1304 Pope Benedict XI granted an indulgence to whoever visited the chapel; one year later on 25 March 1305 the chapel received its definitive consecration. Giotto's work thus falls in the period from 25 March 1303 to 25 March 1305.

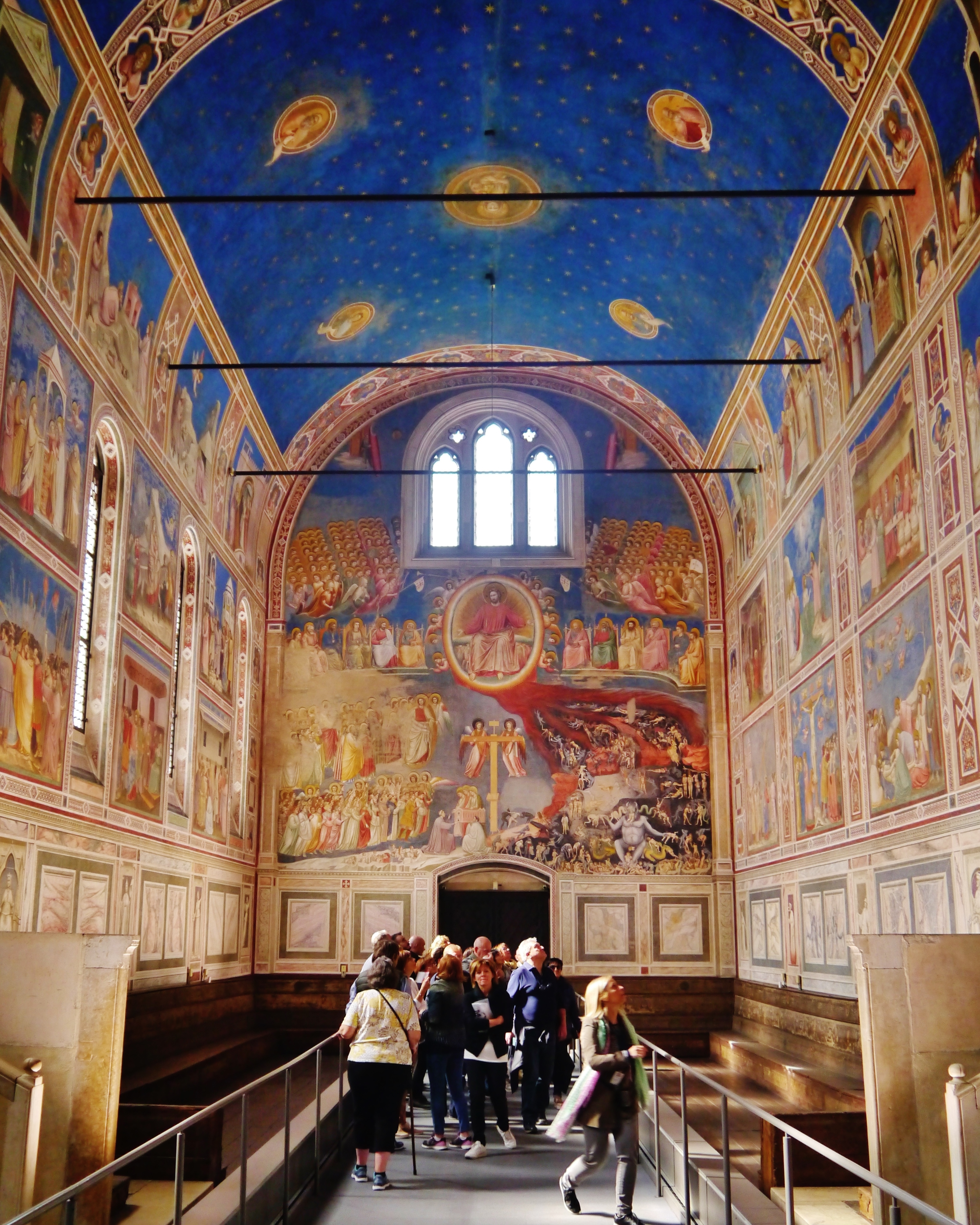
Model of the interior of the chapel, towards entrance

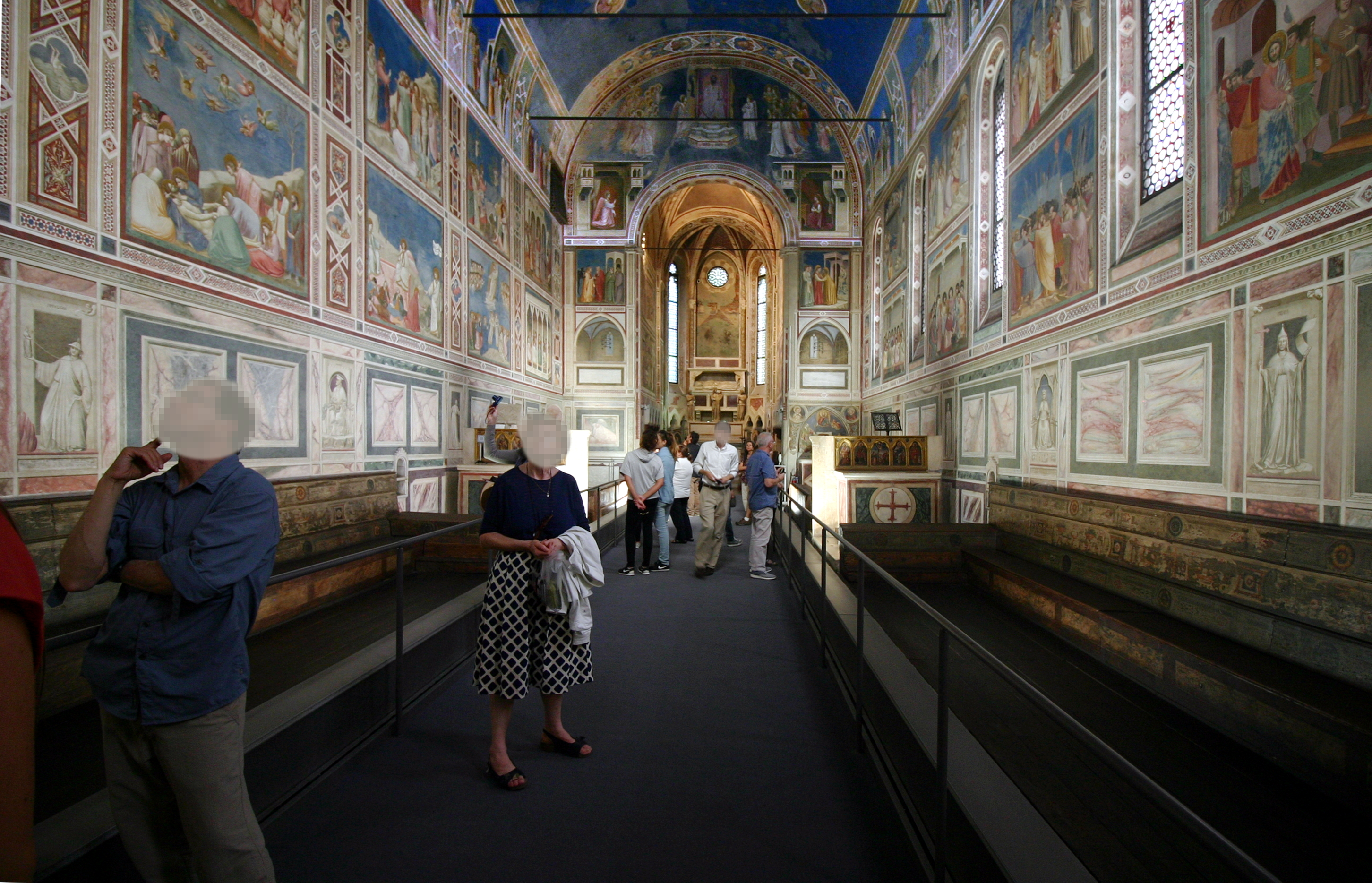
Towards the apse and altar

Giotto, who was born around 1267, was 36–38 years old when he worked at Enrico Scrovegni's chapel. He had a team of about 40 collaborators, and they calculated that 625 work days (giornate) were necessary to paint the chapel. A "work day" meant that portion of each fresco that could be painted before the plaster dried and was no longer "fresh" (fresco in Italian).

In January 1305, friars from the nearby Church of the Eremitani filed a complaint to the bishop, protesting that Scrovegni had not respected the original agreement. Scrovegni was transforming his private oratory into a church with a bell tower, thus producing unfair competition with the Eremitani's activities. We do not know what happened next, but it is likely that, as a consequence of this complaint, the monumental apse and the wide transept were demolished. Both are visible on a model of the church painted by Giotto on the counter-façade (the Last Judgement). The apse was the section where Enrico Scrovegni had meant to have his tomb. The presence of frescoes dating to after 1320 supports the demolition hypothesis proposed by Giuliano Pisani. The apse, the most significant area in all churches, is where Enrico and his wife, Jacopina d'Este, were buried.

This apse presents a narrowing of the space which gives a sense of its being incomplete and inharmonious. When one observes the lower frame of the triumphal arch, right above Saint Catherine of Alexandria's small altar piece, Giotto's perfect symmetry is altered by a fresco decoration representing two medallions with busts of female saints, a lunette with Christ in glory, and two episodes from the Passion (the prayer in the Garden of Gethsemane and the Flagellation of Christ, which together give an overall sense of disharmony. The artist who painted these scenes also painted the greater part of the apse, an unknown artist called "The Master of the Scrovegni Choir" who worked at the Chapel about twenty years after Giotto's work was completed. The main focus of the unknown artist's work is constituted by six monumental scenes on the side walls of the chancel that depict the last period of Mary's earthly life. This choice is in tune with the iconographic program inspired by Alberto da Padova and painted by Giotto.

=== Modern period ===
The chapel was originally connected with the Scrovegni palace, which was built on what remained of the foundations of the elliptical ancient Roman arena. The palace was demolished in 1827 in order to sell the precious materials it contained and to erect two condominiums in its place. The chapel was purchased by the Municipality of the City of Padua in 1881, a year after the City Council's deliberation of 10 May 1880 leading to a decision to demolish the condominiums and restore the chapel.

In June 2001, following a preparation study lasting over 20 years, the Istituto Centrale per il Restauro (Central Institute for Restoration) of the Ministry for Cultural Activities, in collaboration with Padua's Town Hall in its capacity of owner of the Arena Chapel, started a full-scale restoration of Giotto's frescoes under the late Giuseppe Basile's technical direction. In 2000 the consolidation and restoration of the external surfaces had been completed and the adjacent "Corpo Tecnologico Attrezzato" (CTA) had been installed. In this "equipped technological chamber" visitors wait for fifteen minutes to allow their body humidity to be lowered and any accompanying smog dust to be filtered out. In March 2002 the chapel was reopened to the public in its original splendor. A few problems remain unsolved, such as flooding in the crypt under the nave due to the presence of an underlying aquifer, and the negative effect on the building's stability of the cement inserts that replaced the original wooden ones in the 1960s.

=== Scholarly debates ===
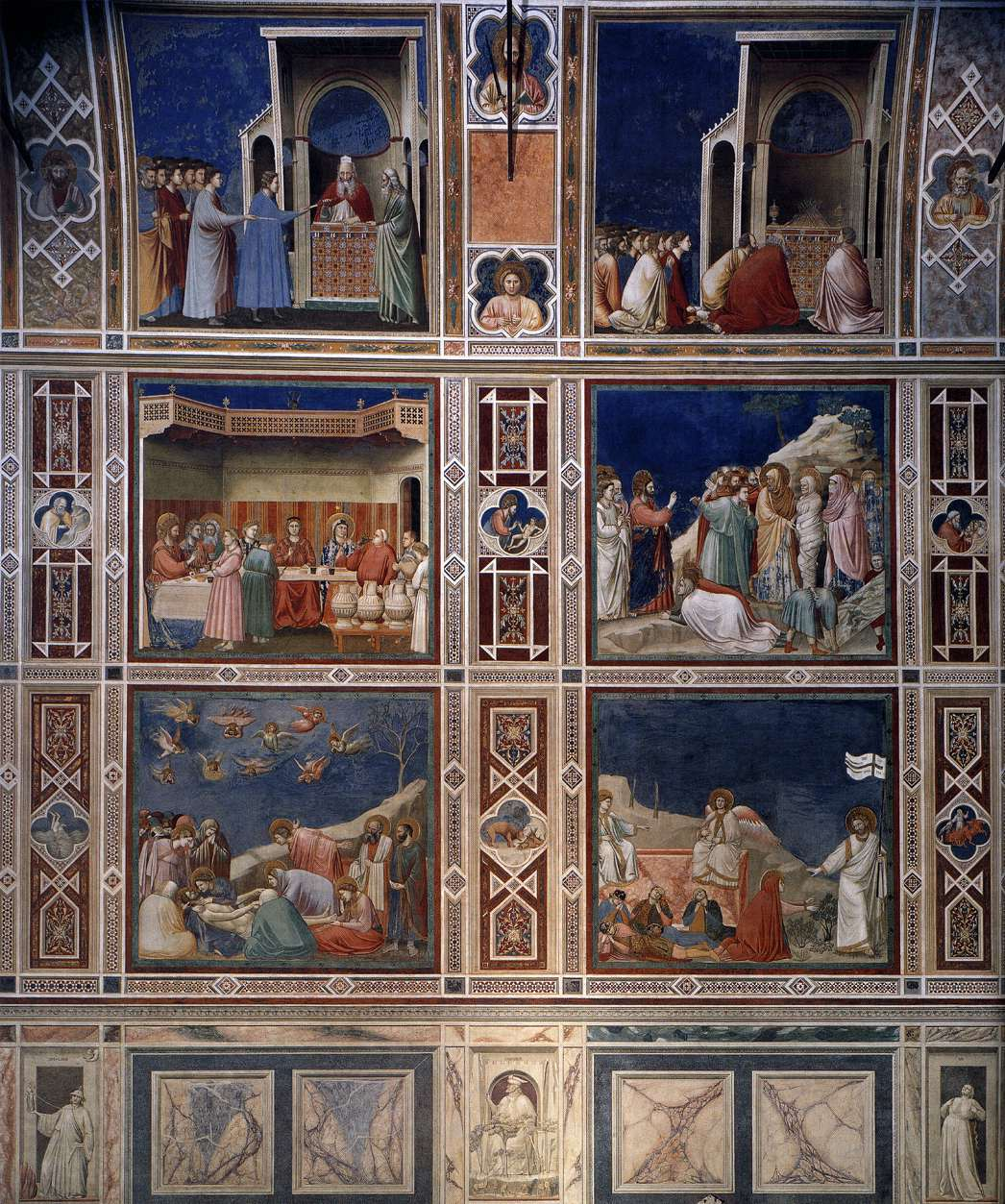
Section of the wall, showing the setting of the narrative panels

Giuliano Pisani's studies argued that a number of commonly held beliefs concerning the chapel are groundless, among them, the notion that Dante inspired Giotto. However, a posthumous portrait of Dante was included in the Paradise section of the frescoes. Another claim was that the theological program followed by Giotto is based on St Thomas Aquinas, whereas Pisani claims it to be wholly Augustinian. Pisani also argued against the conjecture that the Frati Gaudenti fraternity, of which Enrico Scrovegni was a member, influenced the content of Giotto's fresco cycle. He also argued against the belief that Enrico Scrovegni required that the iconography program have no emphasis placed on the sin of usury. Giuliano Pisani pointed out that Dante's condemnation of Scrovegni's father, Reginaldo, as a usurer in Canto 17 of the Inferno dates to a few years after Giotto's completion of the chapel, so it cannot be regarded as a motive behind any theological anxieties on the part of Enrico Scrovegni. Pisani's arguments have not yet been widely embraced by the scholarly community, and that debates persist regarding the impetus for the chapel's creation and the reasons behind its design.

According to Pisani, Giotto painted the chapel's inner surface following a comprehensive iconographic and decorative project devised by the Augustinian theologian, Friar Alberto da Padova. Among the sources utilized by Giotto following Friar Alberto's advice are the Apocryphal Gospels of Pseudo-Matthew and Nicodemus, the Golden Legend (Legenda aurea) by Jacobus de Voragine and, for a few minute iconographic details, Pseudo-Bonaventure's Meditations on the Life of Jesus Christ, as well as a number of Augustinian texts, such as De doctrina Christiana, De libero arbitrio, De Genesi contra Manicheos, De quantitate animae, and other texts from the Medieval Christian tradition, among which is the Phisiologus.

Most Giotto scholarship believes that Giotto had made a number of theological mistakes. For instance, Giotto placed Hope after Charity in the Virtues series, and did not include Avarice in the Vices series, due to the usual representation of Enrico Scrovegni as a usurer. Giuliano Pisani asserts that Giotto followed a careful and deliberate theological programme based on Saint Augustine and devised by Friar Alberto da Padova. Avarice, far from being "absent" in Giotto's cycle, is portrayed with Envy, forming with it a fundamental component of a more comprehensive sin. For this reason Envy is placed facing the virtue of Charity, to indicate that Charity is the exact opposite of Envy, and that in order to cure oneself of the sin of Envy one needs to learn from Charity. Charity crushes Envy's money bag under her feet, while on the opposite wall red flames burn under Envy's feet.

=== The depiction of the sacred stories, and the message of the vault ===
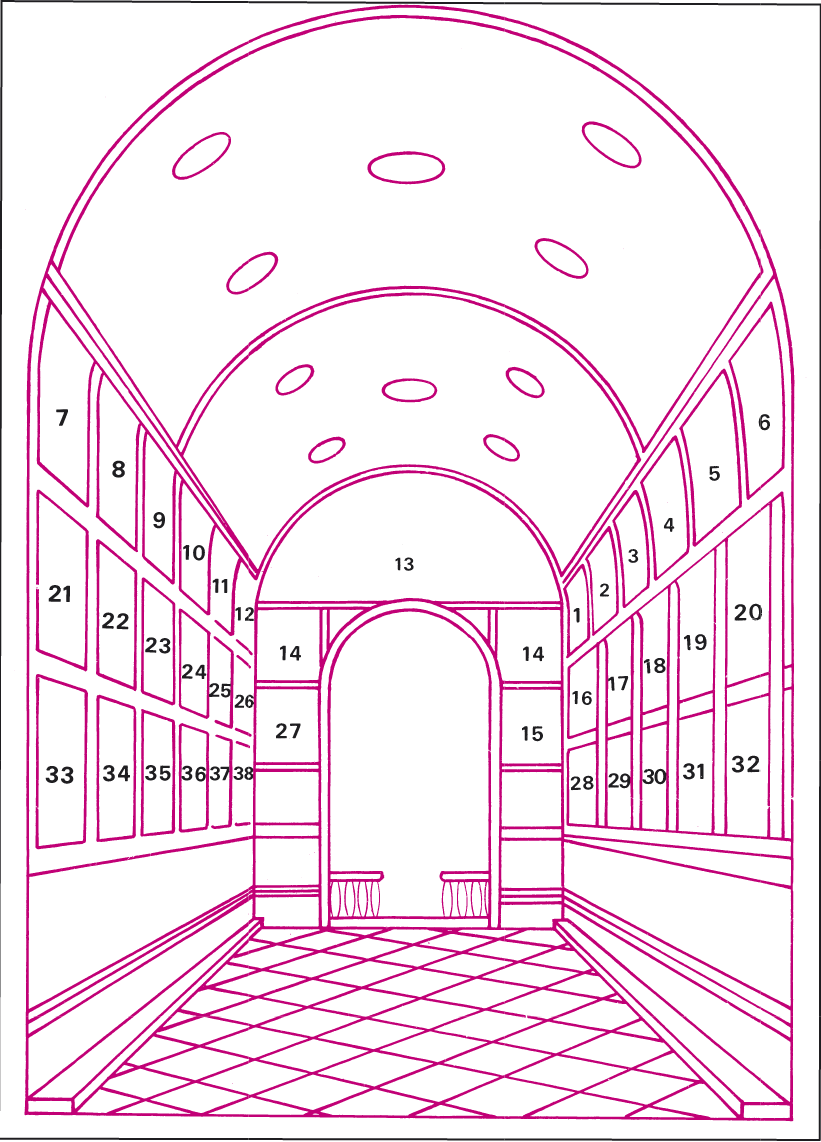
Padua: Scrovegni Chapel. Giotto frescoes in 38 panels with stories of Mary and Christ. 1, Expulsion of Joachim from the temple; 2, St. Joachim shelters among the shepherds; 3, The angel announces to St. Anne that she will be a mother; 4, The angel announces to St. Joachim, the sacrificant, that his prayer will be answered (the composition repeats, placed outdoors with a shepherd replacing the maid); 5, St. Joachim's dream; 6, Meeting of Joachim and Anna at the Golden Gate of Jerusalem; 7, Nativity of Mary; 8, Presentation of Mary at the temple; 9, Delivery of rods to St. Simeon; 10, Prayer for the flowering of the rods; 11, Marriage of Mary; 12, Wedding procession of Mary; 13, God the Father entrusts the Annunciation to Mary to the Archangel Gabriel; 14, Annunciation; 15, Visitation; 16, Nativity of Jesus; 17, Adoration of the Magi; 18, Presentation of Jesus at the temple (on the left, Fanuel's daughter with prophecy scroll); 19, Flight into Egypt; 20, Massacre of the Innocents; 21, Jesus among the doctors; 22, Baptism of Jesus; 23, Wedding at Cana; 24, Resurrection of Lazarus; 25, Entry of Jesus into Jerusalem; 26, Expulsion of merchants from the temple; 27, Judas receives the price of betrayal; 28, Last Supper; 29, Washing of the feet; 30, Judas kiss; 31, Jesus before Caiaphas; 32, Coronation with thorns; 33, Ascent to Calvary; 34, Crucifixion; 35, Deposition; 36, Resurrection; 37, Ascension; 38, Pentecost. In Guida Rossa Veneto Touring Club Italiano

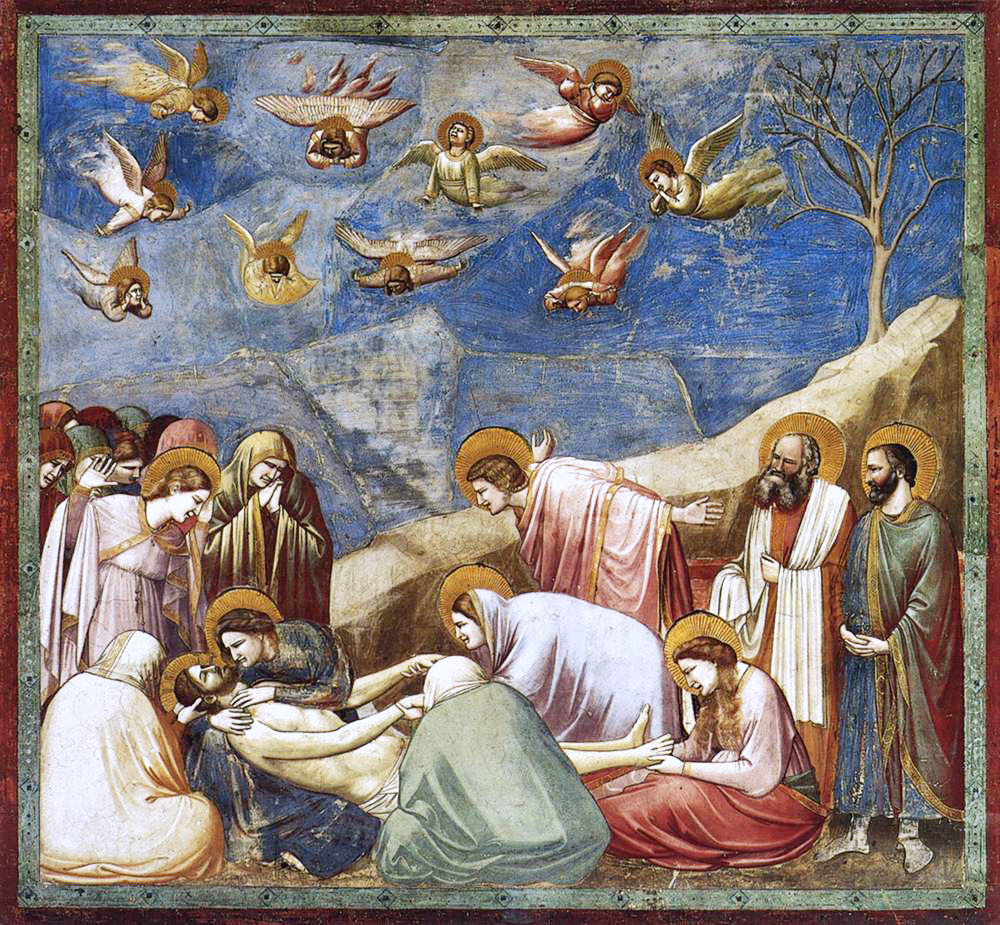
The scene of the Lamentation of Christ

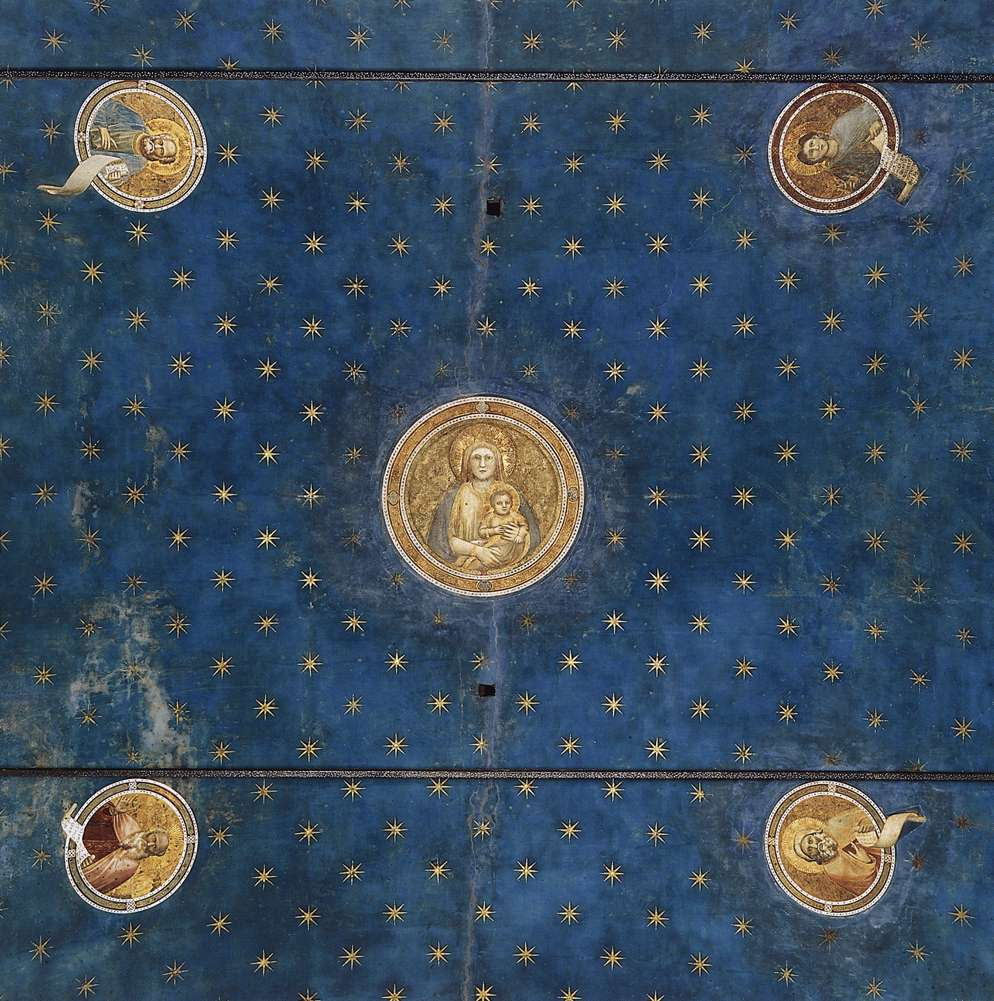
The centre of the vault, with Madonna and Child as one of the two suns, and prophets as planets

Giotto frescoed the chapel's whole surface, including the walls and the ceiling. The fresco cycle is organized along four tiers, each of which contains episodes from the stories of the various protagonists of the Sacred History. Each tier is divided into frames, each forming a scene. The chapel is asymmetrical in shape, with six windows on the longer south wall, and this shape determined the layout of the decoration. The first step was choosing to place two frames between each double window set on the south wall; secondly, the width and height of the tiers was fixed in order to calculate the same space on the opposite north wall.

Cycles of scenes showing the Life of Christ and the Life of the Virgin were the grandest form of religious art in the period, and Giotto's cycle is unusually large and comprehensive, showing the ambition of the commission. Allowing for this, the selection and iconography of the scenes is broadly comparable to other contemporary cycles; Giotto's innovation lies in the monumentality of his forms and the clarity of his compositions.

The cycle recounts the story of salvation. It starts from high up on the lunette of the triumphal arch, with the uncommon scene of God the Father instructing the Archangel Gabriel to perform the Annunciation to Mary. The narrative continues with the stories of Joachim and Anne (first tier from the top, south wall) and the stories of Mary (first tier from the top, north wall). After a return to the triumphal arch, the scenes of the Annunciation and the Visitation follow. The stories of Christ were placed on the middle tier of the south and north walls. The scene of Judas receiving the money to betray Jesus is on the triumphal arch. The lower tier of the south and north walls shows the Passion and Resurrection; the last frame on the north wall shows the Pentecost. The fourth tier begins at ground level with the monochromes of the Vices (north wall) and the Virtues (south wall). The west wall (counter-façade) presents the Last Judgment.

The scenes depicted are as follows:

Sacred stories:

Triumphal arch (lunette):

- The Annunciation to Mary;

Upper tier, south wall:

- The Expulsion of Joachim
- Joachim amongst the shepherds
- An angel comes to Anna in prayer announcing the birth of Mary
- Joachim sacrifices a kid goat to the Lord
- Joachim's dream
- Joachim meets Anna at the Golden Gate

Upper tier, north wall:

- Nativity of Mary and her bathing as an infant
- Presentation of Mary at the Temple
- The bringing of the branches
- Prayer for the blossoming of the branches
- The marriage of the Virgin
- The nuptial cortege

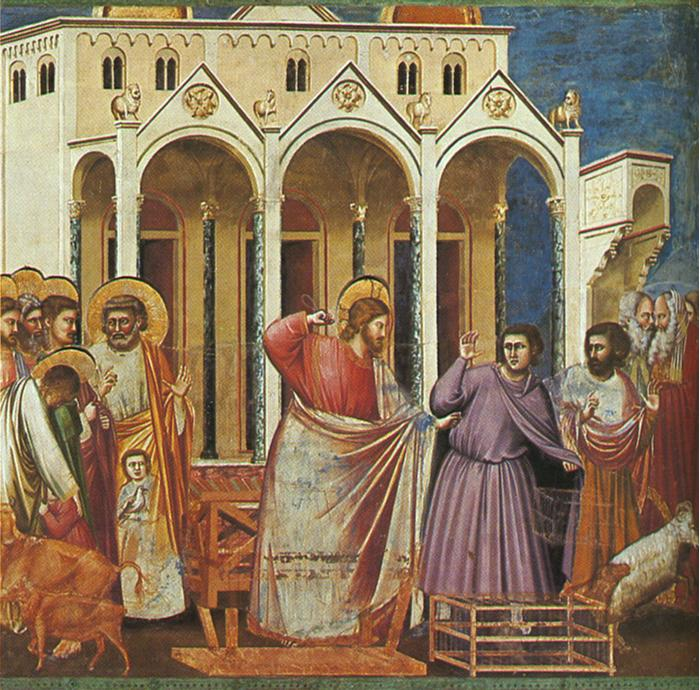
Expulsion of the money changers from the temple

Triumphal arch:

- The Annunciation
- Visitation

Middle tier, south wall:

- The Nativity of Jesus
- The Adoration of the Magi
- The Presentation of Jesus at the Temple
- The Flight into Egypt
- The Massacre of the Innocents

Middle tier, north wall:

- The Finding in the Temple (Jesus among the doctors)
- The Baptism of Jesus
- The Wedding at Cana
- The Resurrection of Lazarus
- Christ enters Jerusalem
- Casting out the money changers

Triumphal arch:

- Judas's betrayal

Lower tier, south wall:

- The Last Supper
- The washing of the feet
- The Kiss of Judas
- Jesus before Caiaphas
- Flagellation of Christ

Lower tier, north wall:

- The ascent to Calvary
- Crucifixion
- Lamentation of Christ
- The Resurrection of Jesus — Noli me tangere
- Ascension
- Pentecost

Bottom tier, north wall: Vices:

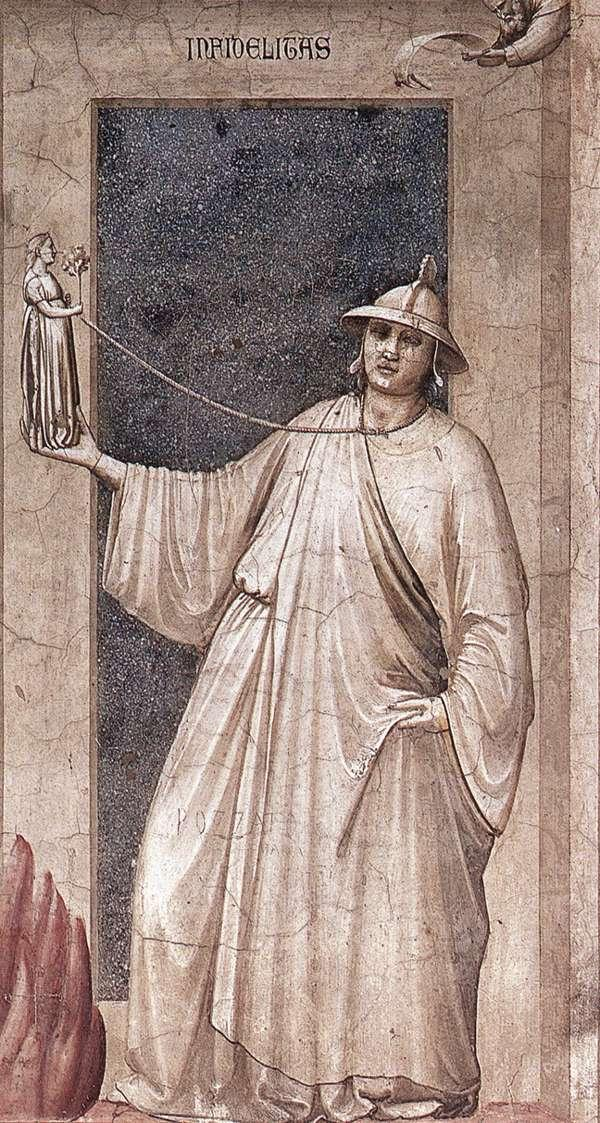
Infidelity

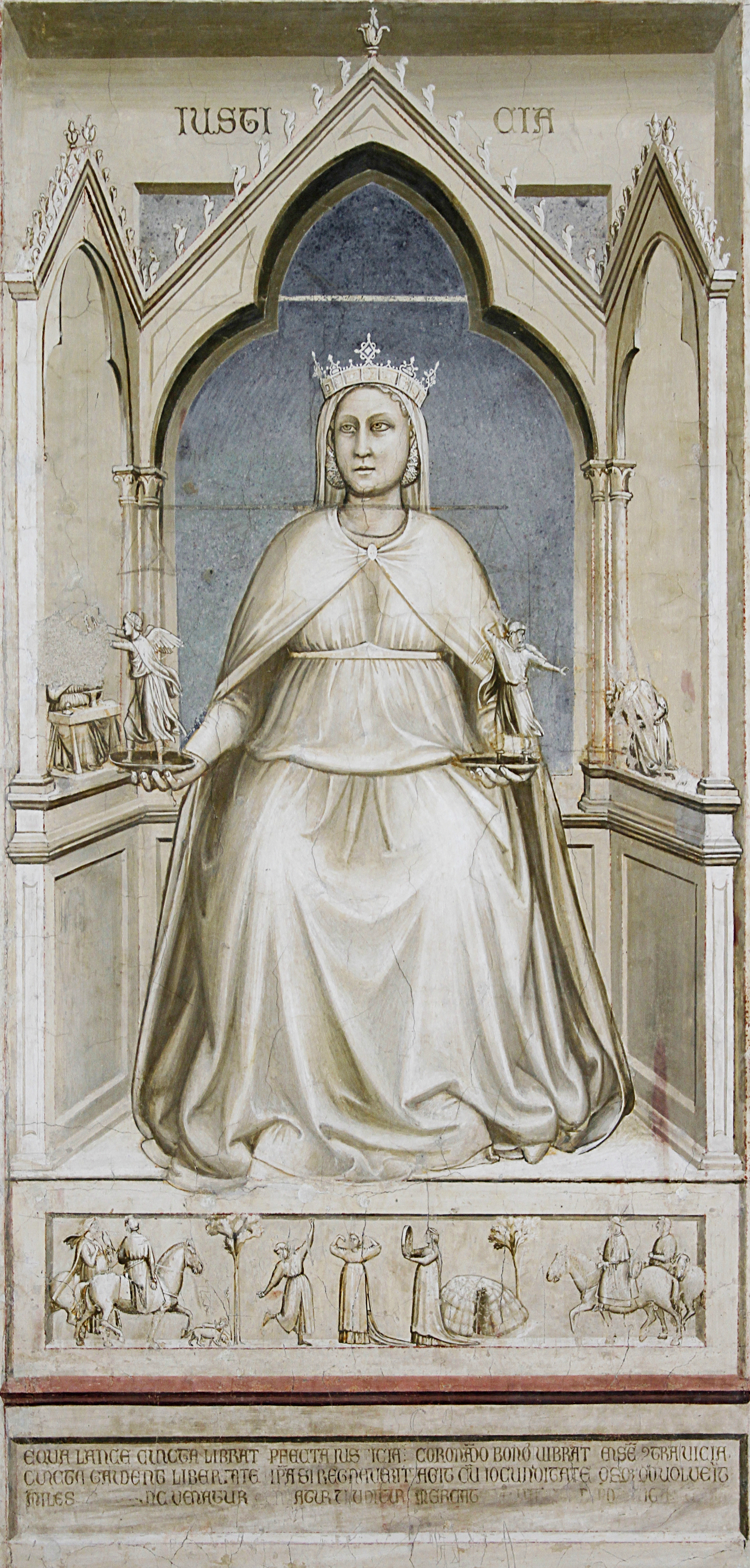
Justice

- Stultitia
- Inconstantia
- Ira
- Iniustitia
- Infidelitas
- Invidia
- Desperatio

Bottom tier, south wall: Seven virtues:

- Prudence
- Fortitude
- Temperance
- Justice
- Faith
- Charity
- Hope

Counter-façade:

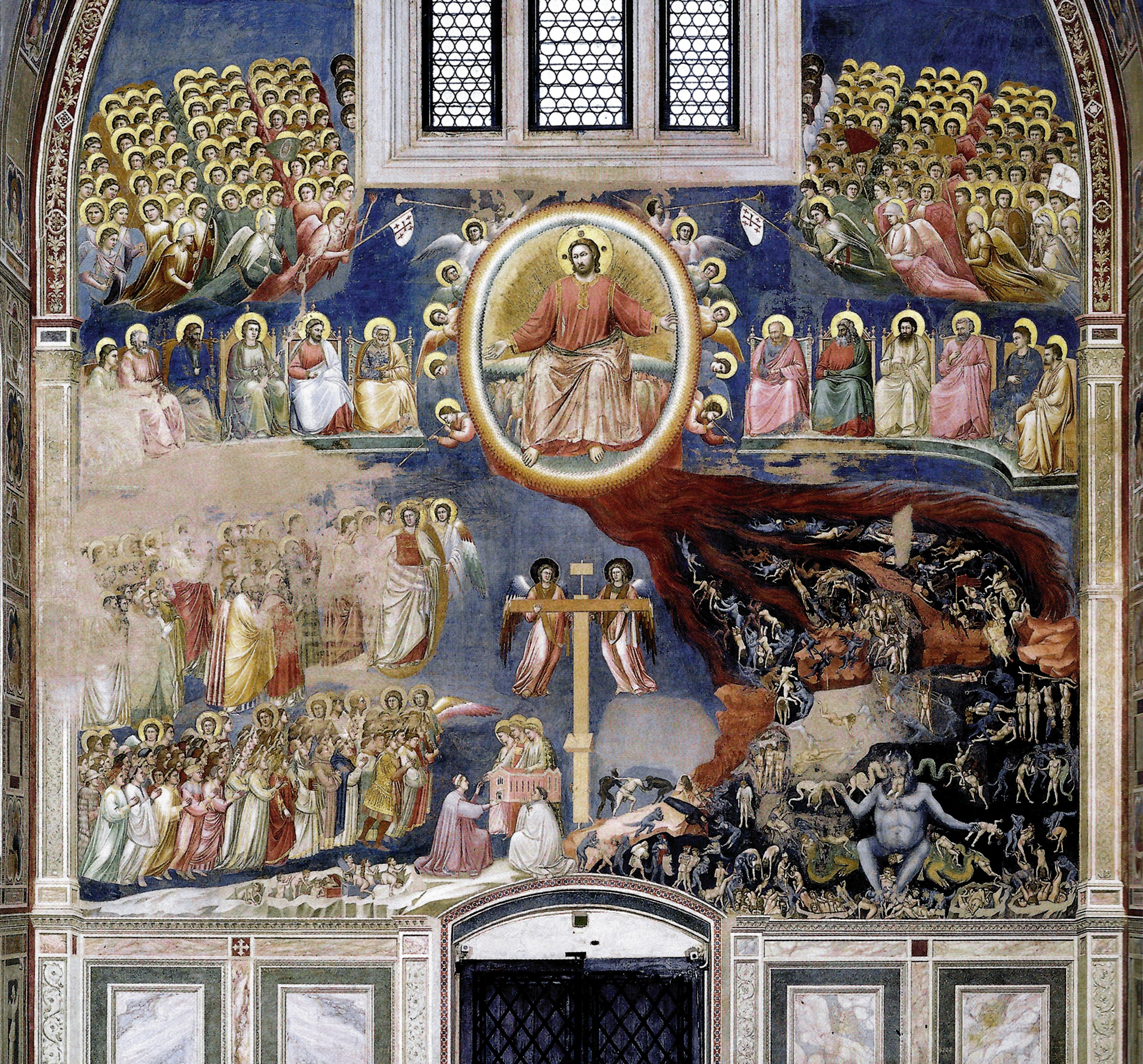
Last Judgment

- The Last Judgment

The vault presents the eighth day, the time of eternity, God's time, with eight planets (the tondos which enclose the seven great prophets of the Old Testament plus John the Baptist) and two suns (which show God and the Madonna and Child), while the blue sky is studded with eight-point stars (8, sideways, symbolises infinity).

=== The monochrome personifications of Vices and Virtues ===
The bottom tiers of the side walls feature 14 personifications in grisaille, representing single figures of Vices on the north wall and Virtues on the south wall. The Vices are Stultitia, Inconstantia, Ira, Iniusticia, Infidelitas, Invidia, and Desperatio. The Virtues are grouped as follows: the four cardinal virtues: Prudentia, Iustitia, Temperantia, Fortitudo, followed by the three theological ones: Fides, Karitas, Spes. Each virtue and vice is embedded within a mirror-like marble frame. The name of the vice or the virtue is written in Latin on top of each figure, indicating what these figures represent, namely, the seventh day (the time between Jesus's birth and the Final Judgement).

According to the controversial theory of Giuliano Pisani, the Vices and Virtues read starting from the altar's side, going towards the counter-façade (Final Judgement), and the sequence is not "Vices first, then Virtues" as was long believed. It rather proceeds from Vice 1 (Stultitia) (north wall, right hand side) to Virtue 1 (Prudencia) (south wall, left hand side), to Vice 2 (Inconstantia) (north wall) to Virtue 2 (Fortitudo) (south side), and so on. Vices and Virtues symbolise humanity's progress toward bliss (heavenly happiness). With the aid of Virtues, humanity can overcome obstacles (Vices). This is the philosophical-theological itinerary designed by Giotto's theologian, a learned theologian who drew his inspiration from Saint Augustine. The Vice-Virtue section of the Arena Chapel illustrates the philosophical-theological message underlying the overall project and is key to clarifying several points previously considered to be either obscure or the result of Giotto's only approximate theological knowledge. For instance, in the Arena Chapel the vices are not the traditional capital vices or deadly sins (Pride, Envy, Wrath, Sloth, Greed, Gluttony and Lust), just like the "corresponding" virtues do not reflect the traditional order, consisting in four "cardinal virtues" (Prudence, Justice, Fortitude and Temperance) and three "theological virtues" (Faith, Hope and Charity).

A twofold therapeutic path leading to salvation is presented. The first, composed of four virtues, brings a cure by means of the opposing force provided by the cardinal virtues. The arrival point in this first part of the itinerary is Justice, Iusticia, who makes peace possible and therefore ensures Paradise on earth and earthly happiness. The first Vice in this first section is Stultitia, namely the incapacity to distinguish good and evil. Its cure (opposite wall) is Prudencia, Prudence, which in classical and theological terms is not "cautiousness" but "moral intelligence" or the capacity to distinguish good and evil. The viewer is in the sphere of Knowledge. Next comes the pair Inconstantia, Inconstancy, (north wall) and Fortitudo, Fortitude, (south wall). Fortitude (moral and mental strength) triumphs over Inconstancy's lewd oscillations by means of will. "Inconstancy" is literally "the lack of a stable seat"; it is a mix of light-headedness, volubility, and inconsistency. "Inconstancy" is portrayed as a young woman rolling over a ball, ready to fall, on a motley marble floor signifying the lack of "unity" ("constancy") which characterizes an inconstant mind. Here is the sphere of Will. Wrath, the third vice, is "tempered" by Temperantia, Temperance. According to Saint Augustine, Temperantia is the inner balance which ensures the will's stable dominion over instincts and keeps human desires within the boundaries of honesty. It is the therapy necessary to prevail over passions, which are symbolized by Wrath, because Wrath is the most perilous of all the passions: it is sudden and destructive, even against own's dearest ones, and is therefore the passion that human beings first need to learn how to control. This notion is a tenet of ancient Greek and (in its footprints) Roman philosophy, which Saint Augustine made his own and Giotto's theologian transmitted to him, fusing together a number of Saint Augustine's writings.

Prudence, Fortitude and Temperance pertain to each individual's ethical sphere of action and have as their goal the cure of each individual "self". Ethical virtue takes form in practical application, through action and behaviour that pertain both to the personal and the social sphere and affect human relations. The notions of Justice and Injustice, the central "pair" in Giotto's Arena Chapel, emanate from this notion. Justice' perfect centrality is visually emphasized by an architectural "die", a small cube that runs above each of the various personifications in a slightly slanted way, pointing either toward the apse or the counter-façade, everywhere but above the head of Justice (south wall) and Injustice (north wall), where the small die falls in a perpendicular line, marking at the same time the exact physical half of the chapel as well as Justice's curing function from a theological-philosophical viewpoint, without forgetting that Justice is what cures the soul of the sickening effects of Injustice (on the chapel's other side).

Those who have successfully progressed in their therapeutic path have attained Justice. Those who have not, have attained Injustice. Those who have attained Justice have practiced a soul's therapy that can be defined as "human" and that led them to earthly happiness. They used as their therapy the "medicina animi", the "soul's medicine" provided by the cardinal virtues (in the sequence Prudence-Fortitude-Temperance-Justice), namely the moral and intellectual virtues with whose "medicine" human beings can be cured of, and are able to prevail over, the opposing vices.

Next come the theological virtues. In order to be able to aspire to heavenly Paradise one needs divine teaching, the revelation of truth, with which one overcomes and transcends human reason, and to practice the theological virtues. The "divine therapy" begins with the rejection of false beliefs (Infidelitas) through Faith in God (Fides). Only with the "medicine" of Charity (Karitas) can man overcome Selfishness and Envy (Invidia), which lead him to look with malevolent eyes (Latin in-vidēre) at his neighbour, who is also made by God in His likeness. Finally, with the aid (the medicine), Hope (Spes) can be contrasted with Lack of Hope, or Desperation (Desperatio). Hope is an attitude consisting in actively waiting for God's future blessings which descend from trust in God and in His word, and also consisting in love, through the love of God, of the whole of humankind.

The sources of this extraordinary program were identified by Pisani in a number of passages of Saint Augustine's works. Everything finds a perfect correspondence with something else. It is the theme of the "therapy of opposites", the sequential order of the cardinal and theological virtues, and the centrality of Justice.

== In literature ==
Giotto's painting of Charity is frequently cited in Remembrance of Things Past by Marcel Proust. Mr. Swann likens the kitchen maid to this painting and it becomes something of a joke between him and the narrator.

Amongst those artists who derived inspiration from the Chapel, British painter Sir Stanley Spencer (1891–1959) is known to have based the scale and narrative sequence for the Sandham Memorial Chapel at Burghclere, near Newbury, England (1924–1932).

== Images ==
Image	Name	Size (cm)	Image	Name	Size (cm)
	The Expulsion of Joachim	200x185		The Birth of the Virgin	200x185
	Joachim among the Shepherds	200x185		Presentation of Mary at the Temple	200x185
	Annunciation to St Anne	200x185		The Bringing of the Rods to the Temple	200x185
	Joachim's Sacrificial Offering	200x185		The Suitors Praying	200x185
	Joachim's dream	200x185		Marriage of the Virgin	200x185
	Joachim and Anne Meeting at the Golden Gate	200x185		Wedding Procession	200x185
	Annunciation – The Angel Gabriel Sent by God	150x195		Annunciation – The Virgin Receiving the Message	150x195

=== The life of Christ ===
Image	Name	Size (cm)	Image	Name	Size (cm)
	Visitation	150x140		Judas' Betrayal	150x140
	Nativity – Birth of Jesus	200x185		Last Supper	200x185
	Adoration of the Magi	200x185		Washing of Feet	200x185
	Presentation of Christ at the Temple	200x185		The Arrest of Christ (Kiss of Judas)	200x185
	Flight into Egypt	200x185		Christ before Caiaphas	200x185
	Massacre of the Innocents	200x185		Christ mocked	200x185
	Christ among the Doctors	200x185		Road to Calvary	200x185
	Baptism of Christ	200x185		Crucifixion	200x185
	Marriage at Cana	200x185		Lamentation (The Mourning of Christ)	200x185
	Raising of Lazarus	200x185		Resurrection (Noli me tangere)	200x185
	Entry into Jerusalem	200x185		Ascension	200x185
	Expulsion of the Money-changers from the Temple	200x185		Pentecost	200x185
	Coretto	150x140		Coretto	150x140

=== Vices and Virtues ===
Image	Name	Size (cm)	Image	Name	Size (cm)
	Prudence	120x60		Foolishness	120x55
	Fortitude	120x55		Inconstancy	120x55
	Temperance	120x55		Wrath	120x55
	Justice	120x60		Injustice	120x60
	Faith	120x55		Infidelity	120x55
	Charity	120x55		Envy	120x55
	Hope (virtue)	120x60		Desperation	120x60

=== Other ===
Image	Name	Size (cm)
	Vault	
	The Annunciation to Mary	230x690
	Last Judgment	1000x840
	Circumcision	200x40
	Crucifix	223x164

== Citations ==
=== Bibliography ===
- Beck, Eleonora M. (2004). "Justice and Music in Giotto's Scrovegni Chapel Frescoes". Music in Art: International Journal for Music Iconography. 29 (1–2): 38–51. ISSN 1522-7464.
- Bokody, Péter. "Justice, Love and Rape: Giotto's Allegories of Justice and Injustice in the Arena Chapel, Padua." In The Iconology of Law and Order, ed. Anna Kerchy and others, 55–66. Szeged: JATE Press, 2012.
- Cordez, Philippe. "Les marbres de Giotto. Astrologie et naturalisme à la chapelle Scrovegni". In "Mitteilungen des kunsthistorischen Institutes in Florenz", 45/1 (2013), 8–25
- Derbes, Anne, and Mark Sandona. The Usurer's Heart: Giotto, Enrico Scrovegni, and the Arena Chapel in Padua. Pennsylvania State University Press, 2008.
- Derbes, Anne, and Mark Sandona, eds. The Cambridge Companion to Giotto. Cambridge University Press, 2004.
- Frugoni, Chiara L'affare migliore di Enrico: Giotto e la cappella Scrovegni Einaudi, 2008
- Jacobus, Laura Giotto and the Arena Chapel: Art, Architecture and Experience Brepols/Harvey Miller Publications, 2008
- Ladis, Andrew Giotto's O Pennsylvania State University Press, 2008
- Giuliano Pisani, L'ispirazione filosofico-teologica nella sequenza Vizi-Virtù della Cappella degli Scrovegni, «Bollettino del Museo Civico di Padova», XCIII, 2004, Milano 2005, pp. 61–97
- Giuliano Pisani, Terapia umana e divina nella Cappella degli Scrovegni, in «Il Governo delle cose», dir. Franco Cardini, Firenze, n. 51, anno VI, 2006, pp. 97–106.
- Giuliano Pisani, L'iconologia di Cristo Giudice nella Cappella degli Scrovegni di Giotto, in «Bollettino del Museo Civico di Padova», XCV, 2006, pp. 45–65
- Giuliano Pisani, Le allegorie della sovrapporta laterale d'accesso alla Cappella degli Scrovegni di Giotto, in «Bollettino del Museo Civico di Padova», XCV, 2006, pp. 67–77.
- Giuliano Pisani, Il miracolo della Cappella degli Scrovegni di Giotto, in Modernitas – Festival della modernità (Milano 22–25 giugno 2006), Spirali, Milano 2006, pp. 329–57.
- Giuliano Pisani, Una nuova interpretazione del ciclo giottesco agli Scrovegni, in «Padova e il suo territorio», XXII, 125, 2007, pp. 4–8.
- Giuliano Pisani, I volti segreti di Giotto. Le rivelazioni della Cappella degli Scrovegni, Rizzoli, Milano 2008, pp. 1–366. ISBN 978-88-17-02722-9; Editoriale Programma, Treviso, 2015, pp. 1–366 ISBN 978-88-6643-353-8.
- Giuliano Pisani, Il programma della Cappella degli Scrovegni, in Giotto e il Trecento, catalogo a cura di A. Tomei, Skira, Milano 2009, I – I saggi, pp. 113–127
- Giuliano Pisani, La fonte agostiniana della figura allegorica femminile sopra la porta palaziale della Cappella degli Scrovegni, in «Bollettino del Museo Civico di Padova», XCIX, 2010 (2014), pp. 35–46
- Giuliano Pisani, La concezione agostiniana del programma teologico della Cappella degli Scrovegni, in Alberto da Padova e la cultura degli Agostiniani, a cura di F. Bottin, Padova University Press, Padova 2014, pp. 215–268
- Giuliano Pisani, Il capolavoro di Giotto. La Cappella degli Scrovegni, Editoriale Programma, Treviso, 2015, pp. 1–176 ISBN 978-88-6643-350-7
- Giuliano Pisani, Dante e Giotto: la Commedia degli Scrovegni, in Dante fra il settecentocinquantenario della nascita (2015) e il settecentenario della morte (2021). Atti delle Celebrazioni in Senato, del Forum e del Convegno internazionale di Roma: maggio-ottobre 2015, ed. by E. Malato e A. Mazzucchi, Tomo II, Salerno Editrice, Roma 2016, pp. 799–815.
- Giuliano Pisani, Le passioni in Giotto, in El corazón es centro. Narraciones, representaciones y metáforas del corazón en el mundo hispánico, ed. by Antonella Cancellier, Cleup, Padova 2017, pp. 550–592.
- Giuliano Pisani, The Scrovegni Chapel, Giotto's Revolution, Translation by Laura Orsi, Philip Harvey and Stefan Mattessich, Skira, Milano 2021, pp. 1-176 (ISBN 978-88-572-4452-5)
- Giuliano Pisani, Giotto and Halley's Comet, in From Giotto to Rosetta. 30 Years of Cometary Science from Space and Ground, ed. by Cesare Barbieri and Carlo Giacomo Someda, Accademia Galileiana di Scienze, Lettere ed Arti, Padova 2017, 341–364.
- Schiller, Gertud, Iconography of Christian Art, Vol. I, 1971 (English trans from German), Lund Humphries, London, ISBN 0853312702
- Stokstad, Marilyn; Art History, 2011, 4th ed., ISBN 0-205-79094-1
