= Giovanni di Buiamonte =

Giovanni di Buiamonte was a Florentine nobleman who lived in the late 13th century around the time of Giotto and Dante. He was highly esteemed in the Florence of his day as “the sovereign cavalier", and was chosen for many high offices.

On the negative side, he was a gambler who lost great sums at play. Additionally, he is known for being a wicked usurer according to Dante in the Divine Comedy.

He was a member of the Becchi family, which means “goats” in Italian.

== Place in Dante's Inferno ==
In Dante's Divine Comedy poem Inferno, Dante says that he saw Giovanni in the inner ring of the Seventh Circle of Hell, where the violent are eternally punished. The inner ring of the Seventh Circle is a burning hot desert with a continual rain of fire. The usurers are to be found sitting on the sand, swatting away fire the way that animals swat bugs, and crying. Vitaliano di Iacopo Vitaliani, along with Giovanni, are the only usurious sinners to be referred to by name. However, around the necks of the other usurious sinners are found purses emblazoned with their family coat of arms. This, and a bit of research into Dante's time-period, make it possible to identify who the suffering sinners are meant to be.

Usurers are considered violent because, as Dante's Virgil explains in Canto XI, usurers sin against Art, and Art is the Grandchild of God.

== Citations ==
Ciardi, John; Dante Alighieri (1954). The Inferno (Translators Notes). London, England: New American Library. pp. 154–155.

Dante, Alighieri (1980). The Divine Comedy. Translated by Allen Mendelbaum. Germany: Alfred A. Knopf. pp. 130–131.
