= Catello di Rosso Gianfigliazzi =

Florentine nobleman

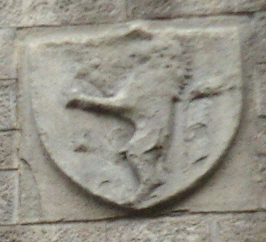
The Gianfigliazzi family was identified by a heraldic device of a lion (blue on a yellow background).

Catello di Rosso Gianfigliazzi was a Florentine nobleman who lived in the late 13th century around the time of Giotto and Dante. He is best known for being a wicked usurer according to Dante in the Divine Comedy. He practiced usury in France and was made a knight upon his return to Florence.

== Place in Dante's Inferno ==
In Dante Alighieri's Divine Comedy poem Inferno, Dante says that he saw Catello in the inner ring of the Seventh Circle of Hell, where the violent are eternally punished. The inner ring of the Seventh Circle is a burning hot desert with a continual rain of fire. The usurers are to be found sitting on the sand, swatting away fire the way that animals swat bugs, and crying. Around their necks are found purses emblazoned with their coats of arms. This, and a bit of research into Dante's time-period, make it possible to identify who the suffering sinners are meant to be.

Usurers are considered violent because, as Dante's Virgil explains in Canto XI, usurers sin against Art, and Art is the Grandchild of God.

== Sources ==
- Eimerl, Sarel (1967). The World of Giotto. New York: Time, Inc. pp. 109.
- Ciardi, John; Dante Alighieri (1954). The Inferno (Translators Notes). London, England: New American Library. pp. 154–155.
- Dante, Alighieri (1980). The Divine Comedy. Allen Mendelbaum (trans.). Germany: Alfred A. Knopf. pp. 130–131.
