= Gianni de' Soldanieri =

Italian politician

Giani de Soldanier
- Occupation: Politician

Giani de Soldanier or Giovanni de Soldanieri was an Italian politician, born in Florence to a Ghibelline family.

He is best known for being found in the 9th circle of hell (canto 32), reserved for those who sin by treachery, by Dante in his epic Inferno.

- Gianni de' Soldanier credo che sia

I think Gianni de' Soldanier is farther on,

- più là con Ganellone e Tebaldello,

with Ganelon and Tebaldello,

- ch'aprì Faenza quando si dormia.

who opened up Faenza while it slept.

Historians hold that while serving as potesta or lord of Faenza, with the help of Tribadello di Zambrasi, he betrayed the town to the Guelfs of Bologna.
