= List of cultural references in the Divine Comedy =

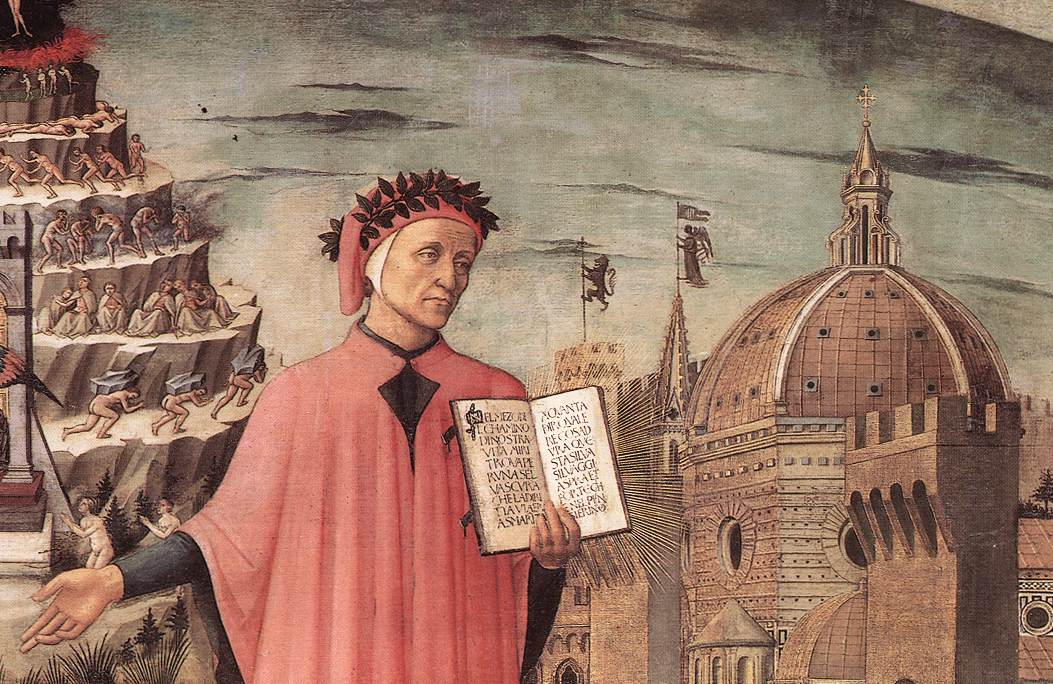
Dante between the mountain of purgatory and the city of Florence (detail of a painting by Domenico di Michelino, Florence, 1465).

The Divine Comedy by Dante Alighieri is a long allegorical poem in three parts (or canticas): the Inferno (Hell), Purgatorio (Purgatory), and Paradiso (Paradise), and 100 cantos, with the Inferno having 34, Purgatorio having 33, and Paradiso having 33 cantos. Set at Easter 1300, the poem describes the living poet's journey through hell, purgatory, and paradise.

Throughout the poem, Dante refers to people and events from classical and biblical history and mythology, the history of Christianity, and the Europe of the medieval period up to and including his own day.

For ease of reference, the cantica names are abbreviated to Inf., Purg., and Par. Roman numerals are used to identify cantos and Arabic numerals to identify lines. This means that Inf. X, 123 refers to line 123 in Canto X (or 10) of the Inferno and Par. XXV, 27 refers to line 27 in Canto XXV (or 25) of the Paradiso. The line numbers refer to the original Italian text.

Boldface links indicate that the word or phrase has an entry in the list. Following that link will present that entry.

Contents:	A B C D E F G H I J K L M N O P Q R S T U V W Z – References

== A ==
- Abbagliato: See **Spendthrift Club**.
- Abel: Biblical second son of **Adam** and brother of **Cain**.
  - Raised by **Jesus** from **Limbo** into Paradise. **Inf. IV, 56**.

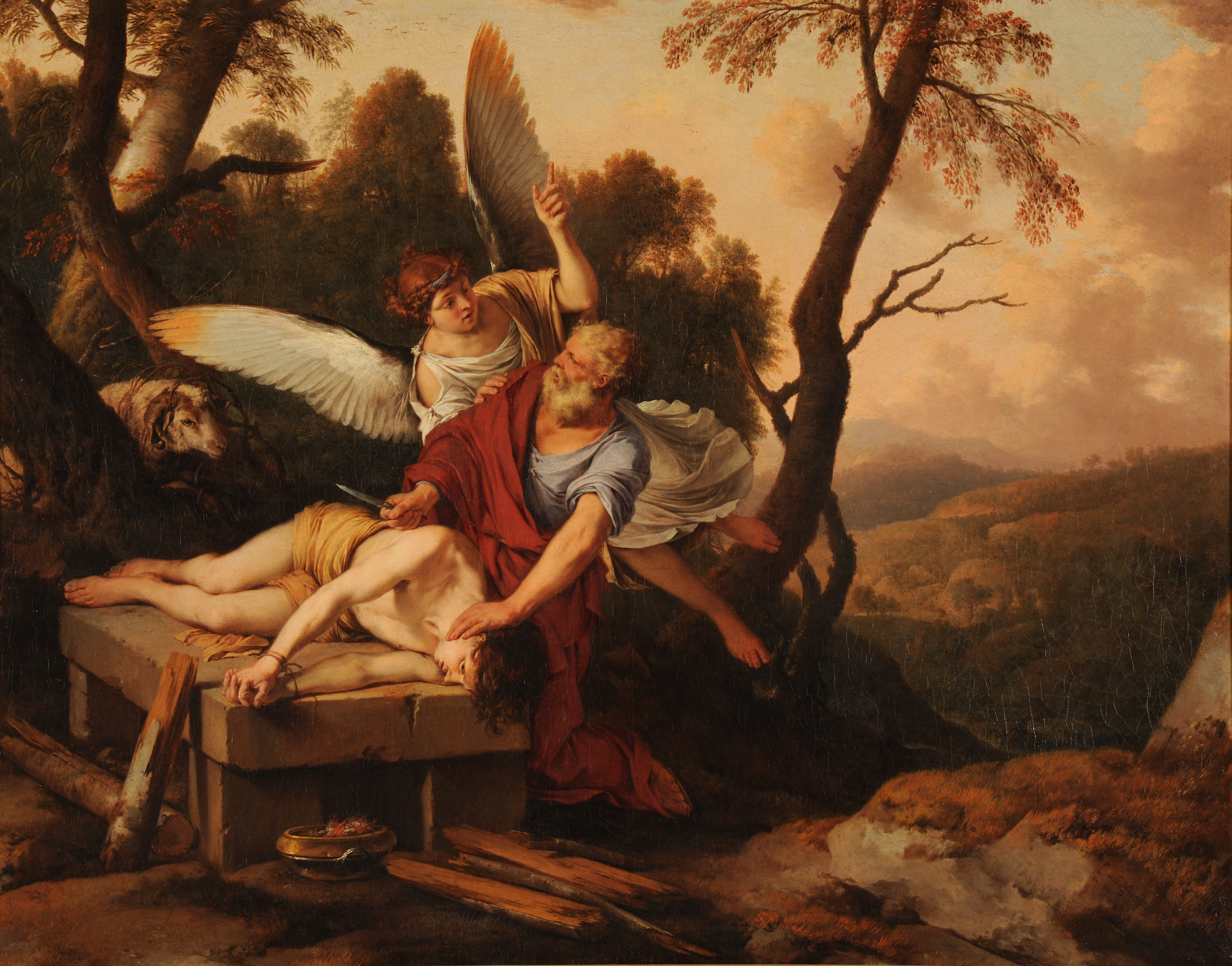
Abraham Sacrificing Isaac by Laurent de La Hyre, 1650

- Abraham the Patriarch: Important biblical figure.
  - Raised by **Jesus** from **Limbo** into Paradise. **Inf. IV, 58**.
- Absalom and Ahithophel: Absalom was the rebellious son of **King David** who was incited by Ahithophel, the king's councilor.
  - **Bertran de Born** compares his fomenting with the "malicious urgings" of Ahithophel. **Inf. XXVIII, 136–138**.
- Achan: Ancient Israelite who stole from Jericho during Joshua's conquest. He was stoned to death for the theft. (Joshua 7:1–26)
  - Cited by souls on the terrace of the greedy as an example of greed. **Purg. XX, 109–111**.
- Acheron: The mythological Greek underworld river over which **Charon** ferried souls of the newly dead into Hades.
  - The "melancholy shore" encountered. **Inf. III, 71–78**.
  - Formed from the tears of the statue of the Old Man of Crete. **Inf. XIV, 94–116**.
- Achilles: The greatest Greek hero in the **Trojan War**. An account well known in the Middle Ages has him killed by **Paris** after having been lured with the promise of **Priam'**s daughter **Polyxena**.
  - Found amongst the sexual sinners. **Inf. V, 65**.
  - Remembered by **Virgil** for having been educated by **Chiron**. **Inf. XII, 71**.
  - His abandonment of **Deidamia** and his only son, at the urging of **Ulysses**, to go to the war against **Troy**. **Inf. XXVI, 61–62**.
  - **Statius** identifies himself in Purgatory as the author of the Achilleid, an unfinished epic poem on the life of Achilles. **Purg. XXI, 92**.
- Acre: Ancient city in Western Galilee, it was the last Christian possession in the Holy Land, finally lost in 1291. **Inf. XXVII, 86**.
- "Ad vocem tanti senis" ("To the voice of such a great elder")
  - Latin line used to maintain the rhyme scheme with neighboring Latin quotations. **Purg. XXX, 18**.
- Adam: According to the Bible, the first man created by God.
  - His "evil seed". **Inf. III, 115–117**.
  - Our "first parent", raised by **Jesus** from **Limbo** into Paradise. **Inf. IV, 55**.
  - Dante sees the tree in the Garden of Eden which caused the fall of Adam and Eve. (See Genesis 3.) **Purg. XXXII, 37–39**.
  - Speaks to Dante. **Par. XXVI, 103–142**
- Adam of Brescia: See **Master Adam**.
- "Adhaesit pavimento anima mea": ("My soul cleaveth unto the dust.") (Psalm 119:25; 118:25 in the Vulgate.)
  - Recited penitentially by prostrate souls on the terrace of greed in Purgatory. **Purg. XIX, 73**.
- Aegina: A Greek island between Attica and Argolis in the Saronic Gulf. According to tradition it was named by its ruler Aeacus—son of **Zeus** and Aegina, daughter of the river-god Asopus—after his mother. In **Ovid'**s Metamorphoses (VII, 501–660), Aeacus, tells of a terrible plague inflicted by a jealous Juno (**Hera**), killing everyone on the island but Aeacus; and how he begged Jupiter (Zeus) to give him back his people or take his life as well. Jupiter then turned the islands ants into a race of men called the Myrmidons, some of whom **Achilles** ultimately led to war against **Troy**.
  - "... all Aegina's people sick ... when the air was so infected ... received their health again through seed of ants.", compared with "the spirits languishing in scattered heaps" of the tenth **Malebolge**. **Inf. XXIX, 58–65**.

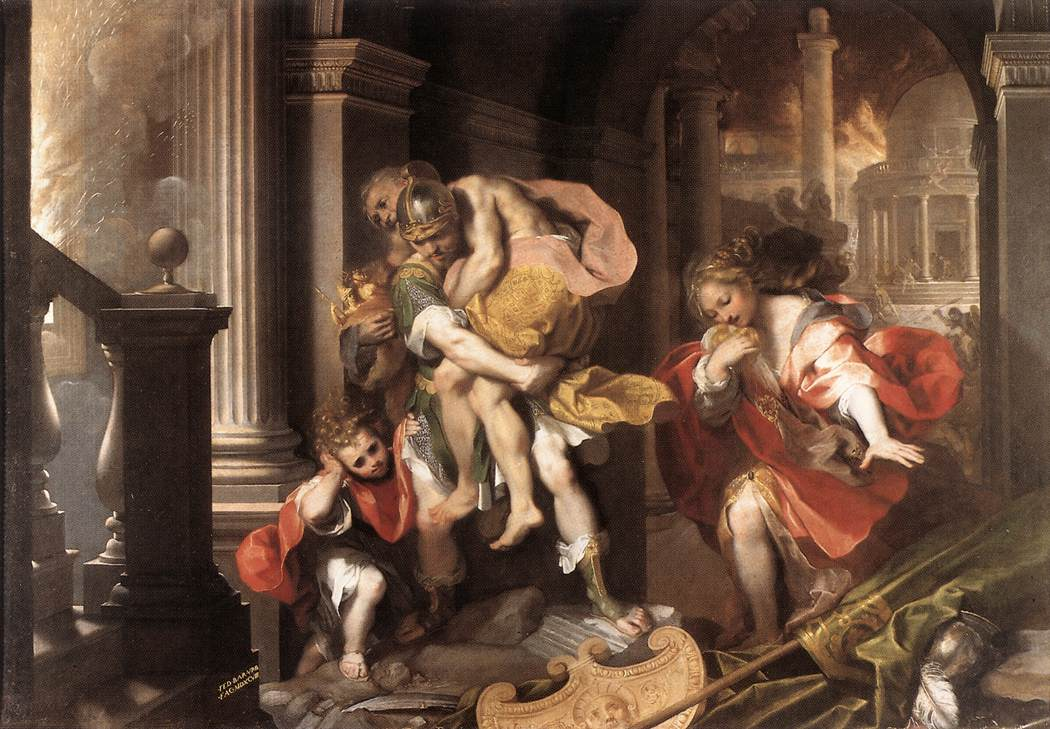
Aeneas flees burning Troy, Federico Barocci, 1598 Galleria Borghese, Rome

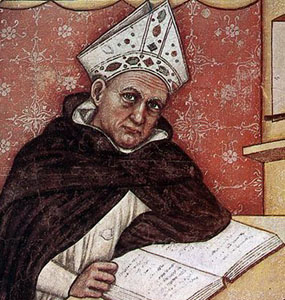
Albertus Magnus (fresco, 1352, Treviso, Italy) by Tommaso da Modena (1326–1379)

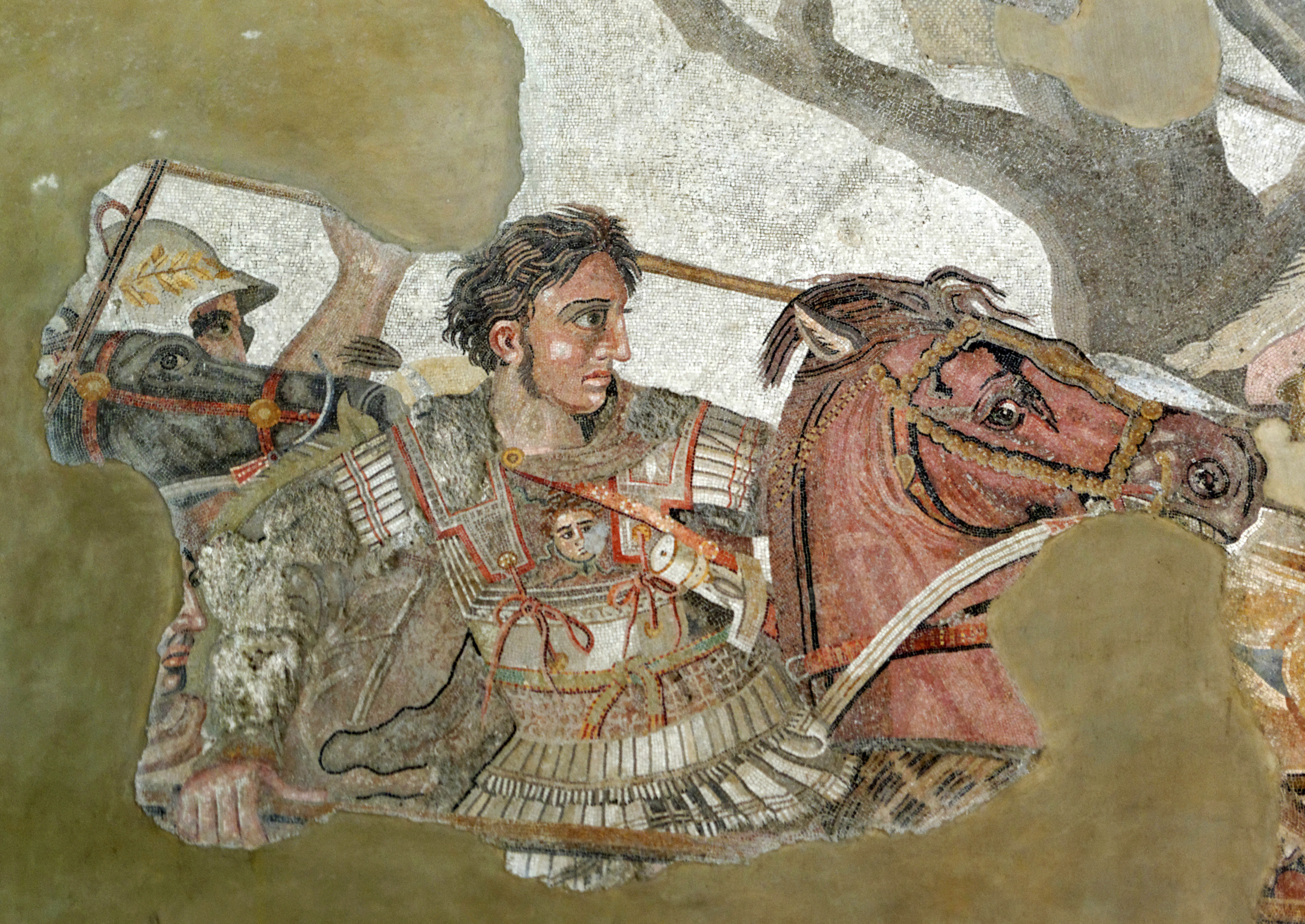
Alexander the Great, mosaic detail, The National Archaeological Museum of Naples, 1st century BCE

- Aeneas: Hero of **Virgil'**s epic poem Aeneid, his descent into hell is a primary source for Dante's own journey.
  - Son of **Anchises**, fled the fall of **Troy**. **Inf. I, 74–75**.
  - "Father of Sylvius", journey to Hades, founder of Rome. **Inf. II, 13–27**.
  - When Dante doubts he has the qualities for his great voyage, he tells Virgil "I am no Aeneas, no **Paul**". **Inf. II, 32**
  - Seen in **Limbo**. **Inf. IV, 122**.
  - "Rome's noble seed". **Inf. XXVI. 60**.
  - Founder of Gaeta. **Inf. XXVI, 93**.
- Aeolus: Ruler of the winds in ancient Greek mythology. **Purg. XXVIII, 21**.
- Aesop: A semi-legendary Greek fabulist of whom little reliable is known. A famous corpus of fables is traditionally assigned to him.
  - His fable of the frog and the mouse is mentioned. **Inf. XXIII, 4–6**.
- Africanus: Agnomen of Publius Cornelius Scipio Africanus (236–183 BCE), the Roman general who defeated the Carthaginian general Hannibal in the Second Punic War.
  - His triumphant reception in Rome mentioned. **Purg. XXIX, 116**.
- Agathon: Greek poet of the 5th century BCE.
  - Resident of **Limbo**. **Purg. XXII, 107**.
- Agapetus: Pope from 535 to 536.
  - In the Heaven of Mercury, the soul of the Emperor Justinian credits Agapetus with correcting him of heretical beliefs. **Par. VI, 13–18**.
- Aglauros: Athenian princess who envied her sister's love affair with Hermes. When she attempted to block Hermes' access, he changed her to stone.
  - Her voice is heard in Purgatory on the terrace of the envious as a lesson in envy. **Purg. XIV, 139**.
- Agnus Dei: Liturgical anthem addressed to **Jesus** as Lamb of God. Sung while the Eucharistic bread is being divided. It ends with "Dona nobis pacem." ("Grant us peace.")
  - Sung by souls in the terrace of the angry in Purgatory. **Purg. XVI, 16–21**.
- Ahasuerus: Ancient King of Persia according to the Book of Esther. He married Esther, whose uncle was Mordecai. Haman, the prime minister, became enraged at Mordecai for refusing to bow in his presence. Haman then plotted a pogrom of the Jews in the kingdom. The plot was discovered, and Ahasuerus had Haman executed.
  - Dante has a vision of the execution as he departs the terrace of the angry in Purgatory. **Purg. XVII, 25–30**.
- Ahithophel: See **Absalom**.
  - Cited as his own analogy by **Bertran de Born**. **Inf. XXVIII, 137**.
- Alardo: See **Tagliacozzo**.
- Alba: Town in Latium near Rome which founded the Latin League in the early years of Rome.
  - According to the soul of the Emperor Justinian, the **eagle** of Roman glory rested in Alba for three centuries. **Par. VI, 37–39**.
- Albert I of Germany: Roman-German King (1298–1308) from the Habsburg family. He was King during the events of the Comedy.
  - Dante refers to him as German Albert ("Alberto tedesco") and condemns him for failing to come south and curb violent conflict in Italy. **Purg. VI, 97–151**.
- Alberto da Casalodi: **Guelph** count of Brescia, he was Signore of **Mantua** during the feuding between Guelphs and **Ghibellins**. He was ousted in 1273 by his advisor **Pinamonte dei Bonacolsi**.
  - His foolishness ("la mattia da Casalodi") in trusting **Pinamonte**. **Inf. XX, 95–96**.
- Alberto da Siena: See **Griffolino of Arezzo**.
- Albertus Magnus (c. 1197–1280): Dominican friar, scholar, and teacher of **Thomas Aquinas**.
  - Standing to the right of Thomas Aquinas in the sphere of the Sun. **Par. X, 98–99**.
- Alcmaeon: Son of Eriphyle, who presumed herself worthy to wear jewelry designed for the gods. Her presumption resulted in her husband's death. Alcmaeon murdered his mother in revenge.
  - Eriphyle is depicted on the pavement in Purgatory as an example of arrogance. **Purg. XII, 50**.
  - Beatrice cites Alcmaeon's act of murder as a moral failure. **Par. IV, 100–105**.
- Tegghiaio Aldobrandi: Florentine son of the famous Aldobrando degli Adimari, he was podestà of Arezzo in 1256 and fought at the battle of Montaperti in 1260, where his warnings against attacking the Senese forces went unheeded, and the Florentines were annihilated.
  - One of a group of famous political Florentines, "who were so worthy ... whose minds bent toward the good", asked about by Dante of **Ciacco**. **Inf. VI, 77–81**.
  - One of a group of three Florentine **sodomites** who approach Dante, and are much esteemed by him (see **Jacopo Rusticucci**). **Inf. XVI, 1–90.**
  - Cryptically described as he, "la cui voce nel mondo sù dovria esser gradita" ("whose voice the world above should have valued"), probably an allusion to his councils at Montaperti. **Inf. XVI, 40–42**.
- Alecto: see **Erinyes**.
- Alexander the Great: King of Macedon (356–323 BCE) and the most successful military commander of ancient history
  - Probably the tyrant pointed out by **Nessus**. **Inf. XII, 107**.
  - Apocryphal story of his adventures in India provide a simile for the punishment of the violent against God in **Inf. XIV, 31–36**.
- Ali: Cousin and son-in-law of **Muhammad**, and one of his first followers. Disputes over Ali's succession as leader of Islam led to the split of Islam into the sects of Sunni and Shi'a.
  - He "walks and weeps" in front of Muhammed. **Inf. XXVIII, 31–33**.
- Amphiaraus: Mythical king of Argos and seer, who although he had foreseen his death, was persuaded to join the expedition of the Seven against Thebes. He was killed while fleeing from pursuers, when **Zeus** threw a thunderbolt, and the earth opened up and swallowed him.
  - The story of his death is told. **Inf. XX, 31–39**.
- Anagni: ancient town in central Italy. Birthplace of Pope Boniface VIII.
  - In 1303, Philip IV of France invaded Italy and captured Boniface at Anagni. **Purg. XX, 86**.
- Pope Anastasius II: Pope who Dante perhaps mistakenly identified with the emperor Anastasius I and thus condemned to hell as a heretic. Anastasius I was a supporter of Monophysitism, a heresy which denied the dual divine/human nature of **Jesus**.
  - Dante and Virgil take shelter behind Anastasius' tomb and discuss matters of theology. **Inf XI, 4–111**.
- Anaxagoras (c. 500–428 BCE): Greek philosopher.
  - Encountered by Dante in **Limbo**. **Inf. IV, 137**.
- Anchises: Father of **Aeneas** by Aphrodite. In the Aeneid he is shown as dying in Sicily.
  - Father of Aeneas. **Inf. I, 74**, **Purg. XVIII, 137**, **Par. XIX, 132**.
- Loderingo Andalò (c. 1210–1293): Of a prominent **Ghibelline** family, he held many civic positions. In 1261 he founded the Knights of Saint Mary or Jovial Friars, a religious order recognized by Pope Clement IV. Its mission was to promote peace between warring municipal factions, but its members soon succumbed to self-interest. Together with **Catalano dei Malavolti**, he shared the position of governor of Florence. Loderingo is extolled for his fortitude in dying by his friend, the poet Guittone d'Arezzo.
  - Among the hypocrites. **Inf. XXIII, 103–109**.
- Andrea de' Mozzi: Chaplain of the popes Alexander IV and Gregory IX, he was made bishop of Florence in 1287 and there remained until 1295, when he was moved to Vicenza, only to die shortly after.
  - One of a group of sodomites identified by **Brunetto Latini** to Dante. Brunetto (i.e. Dante) blasts him with particular harshness, calling him "tigna". **Inf. XV, 110–114**.
- Angiolello di Carignano: See **Malatestino**.
- Anglo-Scottish War: the state of endemic conflict between England and Scotland in which neither side could 'remain within their borders'.
  - cited by the **Eagle** of divine justice as a matter of shame for Christians, **Par. XIX, 121–123**.
- Annas: The father-in-law of **Caiaphas**, he also is called High-Priest. He appears to have been president of the Sanhedrin before which **Jesus** is said to have been brought.
  - Among the hypocrites, he suffers the same punishment as Caiaphas. **Inf. XXIII, 121–122**.
- Antaeus: Son of Neptune and Gaia. A half-giant whose invincible strength came from contact with the earth. Hercules killed him by lifting him from the earth and crushing him.
  - He was seen as a giant not chained in the "Well of the Giants" and lowers Dante and Virgil onto the surface of **Cocytus**. **Inf. XXXI, 112–145**.
- Antenor of Troy: Counselor to King Priam of Troy during the events of the Trojan War.
  - The second ring of **Cocytus**, where the treacherous to country are punished, is named Antenora. **Inf. XXXII, 88**.
- Antigone and Ismene: Theban princesses and daughters of Oedipus and Jocasta who appear in several ancient plays.
  - Residents of Limbo. **Purg. XXII, 110–111**.
- Antiochus IV Epiphanes (c. 215–163 BCE): Last powerful Seleucid king, he is famous principally for his war against the Maccabees.
  - Just as he "sold" the High Priesthood to **Jason**, **Philip IV of France** "sold" the papacy to **Clement V**. **Inf. XIX, 86–87**.
- Apollo: Greek god of the sun, music and prophecy who led the Muses, the goddesses who inspired literature and arts.
  - Dante invokes Apollo to inspire and guide his writing at the opening of the Paradiso. **Par. I, 13**, **Par. II, 8**.
- Apulia: A region in southeastern Italy bordering the Adriatic Sea in the east, the Ionian Sea to the southeast, and the Strait of Otranto and Gulf of Taranto in the south. In the Middle Ages, it referred to all of southern Italy. The barons of Apulia broke their promise to defend the strategic pass at Ceperano for **Manfred**, the son of **Frederick II**, and allowed **Charles of Anjou** to pass freely into Naples. Manfred was subsequently killed (1266) at the Battle of Benevento, a crucial blow to the **Ghibelline** cause.
  - Its "fateful land" as battleground, and Apulia's betrayal. **Inf. XXVIII, 7–21**.
- Aquarius: The eleventh sign of the zodiac. When the sun is in Aquarius (between January 21 and February 21), the days start to visibly grow longer and day and night begin to approach equal length. **Inf. XXIV, 1–3**.

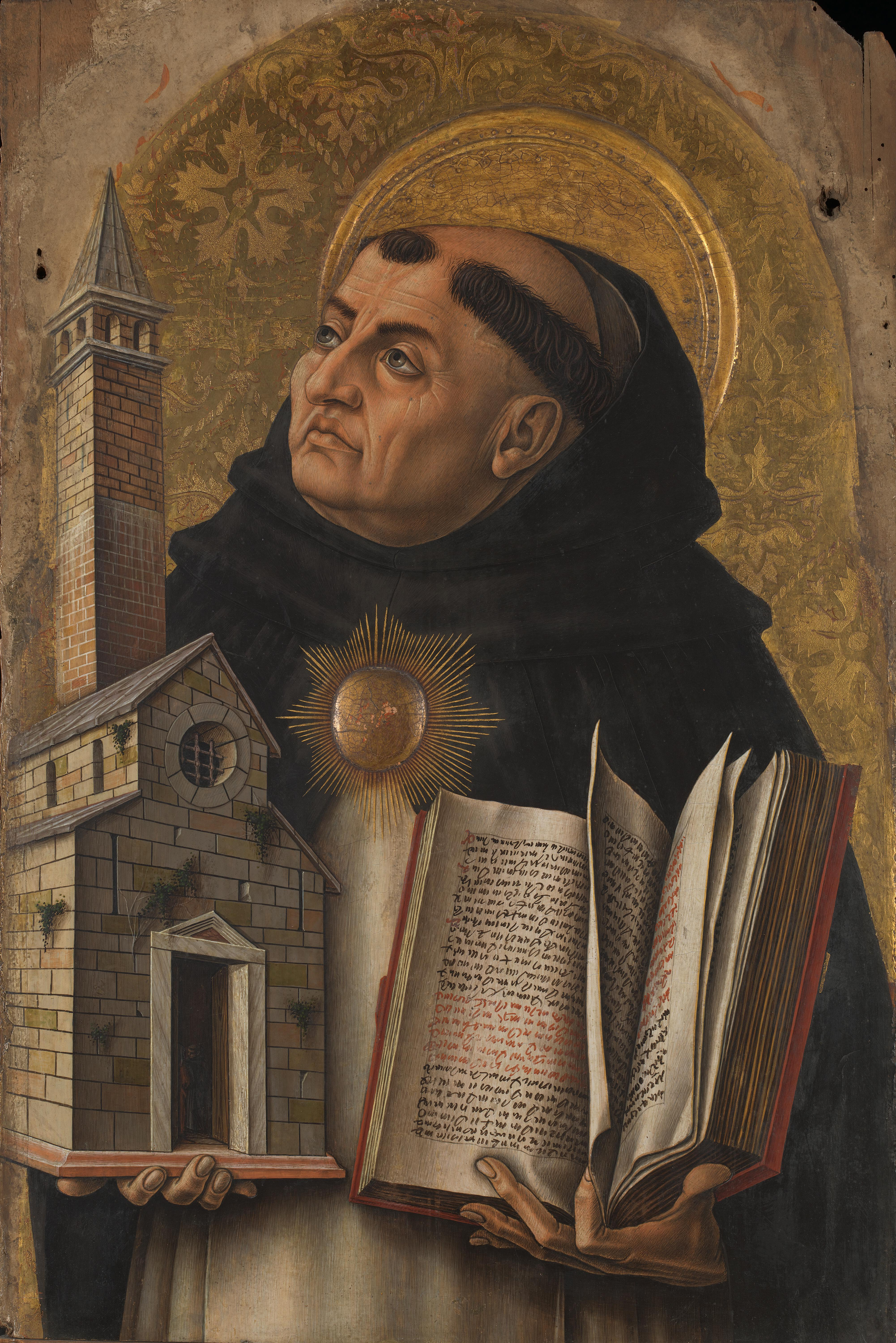
St. Thomas Aquinas from the Demidoff Altarpiece by Carlo Crivelli

- Thomas Aquinas: Dominican theologian considered to be one of the greatest scholars of the Church.
  - Dante claims that he was murdered by **Charles of Anjou**. **Purg. XX, 69**.
  - He introduces wise men in the sphere of the Sun. **Par. X, 98–138**.
  - He eulogises **St. Francis**. **Par. XI, 37–117**.
  - He condemns Dominicans who have strayed from the true Dominican charism. **Par. XI, 124–139**.
- Arachne: In Greek mythology, a woman who challenged Athena to a contest of skill in weaving. Athena destroyed her work and converted the woman into a spider.
  - Depicted on the pavement in Purgatory as an example of arrogance. **Purg. XII, 43**.
- Arcolano of Siena: A member of the Maconi family, he was a member of the notorious Sienese **Spendthrift Club**. He fought in the Battle of Pieve al Toppo in 1288, where according to Giovanni Boccaccio, he preferred to die in battle rather than live in poverty.
  - Probably "Lano", one of two spendthrifts (the other being **Jacomo da Sant' Andrea**) whose punishment consists of being hunted by female hounds. **Inf. XIII, 115–129**.
- Arethusa: In Greek mythology she was a nymph daughter of Nereus. Running away from a suitor, Alpheus, she was transformed by Artemis into a fountain.
  - Her transformation, as described in **Ovid'**s Metamophoses (V, 572–641), is compared to the fate of the thieves. **Inf. XXV, 97–99**.
  - **Geryon's** adornments, compared to her weavings. **Inf. XVII, 14–18**.
- Filippo Argenti: A **Black Guelph** and member of the Adimari family, who were enemies of Dante. **Inf. VIII, 31–66**.
- Argia: Ancient Theban woman, sister of Deipyle and wife of Polynices.
  - Resident of **Limbo**. **Purg. XXII, 111**.
- Argus: Giant of ancient Greek mythology with multiple eyes.
  - Compared to the eyes on the four allegorical beasts in the **Pageant of the Church Triumphant**. **Purg. XXIX, 94**.
- Ariadne: Daughter of **Minos**, king of Crete, who helped **Theseus** kill the **Minotaur**, the offspring of Ariadne's mother Pasiphaë and a bull.
  - Referred to as the sister of the Minotaur. **Inf. XII, 20**.
- Aristotle: 4th-century BCE Greek philosopher whose writings were a major influence on medieval Christian scholastic philosophy and theology, particularly on the works of **Thomas Aquinas**.
  - As "il maestro di color che sanno" ("the master of those who know") he is among those encountered by Dante in **Limbo**. **Inf. IV, 131**.
  - His Nicomachean Ethics quoted by **Virgil**. **Inf. XI, 79–84**.
  - His Physics, referred to by Virgil. **Inf. XI, 101–104**.
  - Mentioned by Virgil as one "who would—if reason could—have been content". **Purg. III, 43**.
- Argives: People of Argos, or more generally all Greeks **Inf. XXVIII, 84**.
- Arles: City in the south of France and supposed location of the tombs of Charlemagne's soldiers who fell in the battle of Roncesvalles.
  - Simile for the tombs in the sixth circle. **Inf. IX, 112**.
- Arno: River which runs through **Florence**.
  - Subject of a discourse on the vices of the people of **Tuscany**. **Purg. XIV, 16–66**.
- Aruns: In **Lucan'**s epic poem Pharsalia, he is the Etruscan seer who prophesies the Civil war, **Caesar'**s victory over Pompey, and its ending in 48 BCE.
  - Seen among the seers. Dante mentions his cave, which he locates (erroneously) near Luni. **Inf. XX, 46–51**.
- Asdente: See **Mastro Benvenuto**.
- "Asperges me" ("Thou shalt sprinkle me"): Psalm 51:9 (Psalm 50:9 in the Vulgate Bible). Opening of the Asperges, a hymn sung during the sprinkling of a congregation with Holy Water. "Thou shalt sprinkle me with hyssop, and I shall be cleansed: thou shalt wash me, and I shall be made whiter than snow."
  - Dante hears the hymn when he is carried through the River **Lethe**. **Purg. XXXI, 97–99**.
- Athamas: See **Hera**.
- Athena: Greek Goddess of Wisdom. "Pallas" is a widely used epithet for her.
  - In Purgatory, she is depicted in a pavement carving casting **Briareus** from Olympus. **Purg. XII, 31**.
  - As the goddess of wisdom, she propels his metaphorical sailing ship in the heavens. **Par. II, 8**.
- Athens: Major Greek city of antiquity.
  - Commended by Dante as an example of good government. **Purg. VI, 139**.

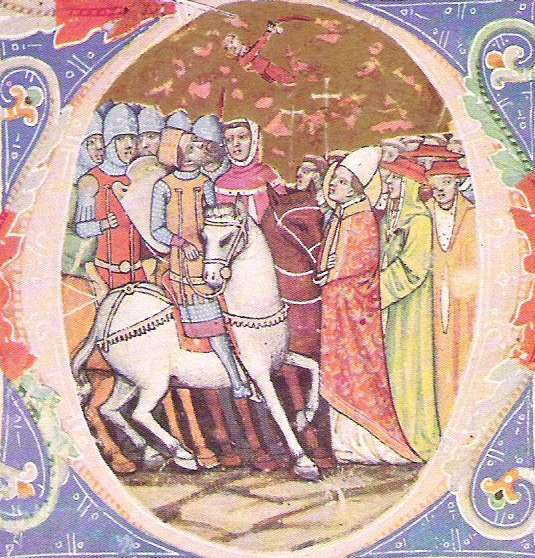
Attila meeting Pope Leo from the Chronicon Pictum, c. 1360.

- Atropos: The Fate who determines mortals' deaths by cutting their threads.
  - It is said that sometimes a sinner's soul falls to Cocytus before she cuts their thread, leaving the body to be taken over by a demon. **Inf. XXXIII, 126**.
- Attila the Hun (c. 406–453): King of the Huns, known in Western tradition as the "Scourge of God".
  - Pointed out by **Nessus**. **Inf. XII, 133–134**.
  - Confused by Dante with Totila who destroyed Florence in 542. **Inf. XIII, 149**.
- Augustus (63 BCE – 14 CE): The Roman Emperor under whom **Virgil** found fame as a poet.
  - Called "the good Augustus" by Virgil. **Inf. I, 71**.
  - Augustus took charge of Virgil's physical and literary remains after his death. "My bones were buried by Octavian." **Purg. VII, 6**.
  - His triumphant chariot compared to the chariot in the **Pageant of the Church Triumphant**. **Purg. XXIX, 116**.
- Aurora: Roman goddess of dawn
  - Used as a poetic reference to sunrise in Purgatory. **Purg. II, 8**.
- Ave: "Ave gratia plena, Dominus tecum." (Hail, highly favored one, the Lord is with you.) Words addressed by the angel Gabriel to the **Virgin Mary**, announcing the birth of Jesus.
  - Words seen in a wall carving depicting the Annunciation. **Purg. X, 40**.
- Ave Maria: Prayer to the Virgin **Mary**.
  - Sung by Piccarda in the Heaven of the Moon. **Par. III, 122**.
- Averroes (1126–1198): Andalusian-Arab philosopher, physician, and famous commentator ("il gran comento") on **Aristotle**.
  - Encountered by Dante in **Limbo**. **Inf. IV, 144**.
- Avicenna (980–1037): Persian physician, philosopher, and scientist. He wrote commentaries on **Aristotle** and **Galen**.
  - Encountered by Dante in **Limbo**. **Inf. IV, 143**.
- Azzo VIII: Lord of Ferrara, Modena and Reggio from 1293 until his death in 1308. He was rumoured to have murdered his father **Obizzo II d'Este**.
  - The "figliastro" who killed Obizzo. **Inf. XII, 112**.

== B ==
- Bacchus: The Roman name of the Greek god Dionysus, protector of wine.
  - Born in the Thebes. **Inf. XX, 59**.
- Barbarossa: Frederick I Barbarossa, Holy Roman Emperor (1155–1190). He captured Milan in his Italian campaign in 1154. **Purg. XVIII, 119**.
- Barrators: Those who have committed the sin of **barratry**.
  - The barrators, are found in the fifth pouch in a lake of boiling pitch guarded by the **Malebranche**. **Inf. XXI–XXII**.
- Barratry: The sin of selling or paying for offices or positions in the public service or officialdom (cf. **simony**).
  - One of the sins of ordinary fraud punished in the eighth circle. **Inf. XXI, 60**.
- "Beati misericordes": "Blessed are the merciful." (Mat 5:7)
  - Heard by Dante as he passed upward out of the terrace of the envious. **Purg. XV, 38**.
- "Beati mundo corde": "Blessed are the pure in heart." (Mat 5:8).
  - Sung by an angel before Dante passed upward out of the terrace of the lustful. **Purg. XXVII, 8**.
- "Beati pacifici": "Blessed are peacemakers." (Mat 5:9)
  - Heard by Dante as he passed upward out of the terrace of the angry. **Purg. XVII, 68–69**.
- "Beati pauperes spiritu": "Blessed are the poor in spirit." (Mat 5:3)
  - Heard by Dante as he passed upward out of the terrace of the prideful. **Purg. XII, 110**.
- "Beati quorum tecta sunt peccata": "Blessed are they whose sins are covered." (Psalm 32:1; Psalm 31:1 in the Latin Vulgate.)
  - Sung by **Matilda** as she conversed with Dante in **Terrestrial Paradise**. **Purg. XXIX, 1–3**.
- Baptist: See **John the Baptist**.

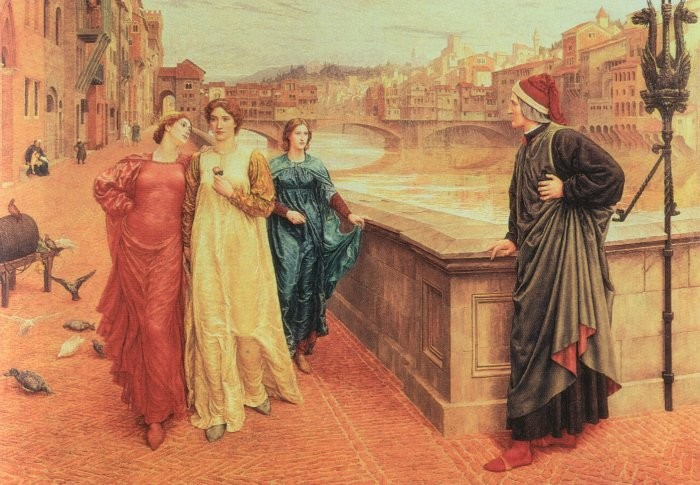
The meeting of Dante and Beatrice, Henry Holiday

- Beatrice (1266–1290): Dante's idealised childhood love, Beatrice Portinari. In the poem, she awaits the poet in Paradise, replaces **Virgil** as Dante's guide, and conducts him through the heavens. She symbolises Heavenly Wisdom.
  - The "worthier spirit" who Virgil says will act as Dante's guide in Paradise. **Inf. I, 121–123**.
  - Asks Virgil to rescue Dante and bring him on his journey. **Inf. II, 53–74**.
  - Asked by **Lucia** to help Dante. **Inf. II, 103–114**.
  - When Dante appears upset by **Farinata'**s prophecy on his future exile, **Virgil** intervenes and explains to him that Beatrice, "quella il cui bell' occhio tutto vede" ("one whose gracious eyes see everything"), will eventually clarify all. **Inf. X, 130–132**.
  - Virgil, speaking with **Chiron**, alludes to Beatrice as she who has entrusted Dante to him. **Inf. XII, 88**.
  - Speaking with **Brunetto Latini** Dante alludes to her as the woman who shall fully explain the sense of Brunetto's prophecy regarding his exile from Florence. **Inf. XV, 90**.
  - Virgil uses the promise of meeting Beatrice to encourage Dante to enter the fire of Purgatory. **Purg. XXVII, 36**.
  - Dante meets Beatrice in Purgatory. **Purg. XXX, 31**.
- Saint Bede: English monk, and scholar, whose best-known work, Historia ecclesiastica gentis Anglorum (The Ecclesiastical History of the English People) gained him the title "The father of English history".
  - Encountered in the Fourth Sphere of Heaven (The sun). **Par. X, 130–131**.
- Belacqua: Personal acquaintance of Dante's, perhaps Duccio di Bonavia, a music instrument maker noted for his laziness.
  - Dante encounters him in Ante-Purgatory, waiting a lifetime because he waited to his deathbed to repent. **Purg. IV, 106–135**.
- Belisarius: (c. 500–565) Roman general who served under the Emperor Justinian and regained much of Italy for the Empire.
  - Commended by the soul of Justinian in Heaven. **Par. VI, 25–27**.
- "Benedictus qui venis" ("Blessed are you who come") Variation of "Benedictus qui venit" ("Blessed is he who comes"), sung in the Sanctus of the Latin Mass. The phrase comes from the Gospel of Mark (Mark 11:10), when the crowds welcome **Jesus** into Jerusalem.
  - Sung by angels in the **Pageant of the Church Triumphant**, welcoming **Beatrice** to the procession. **Purg. XXX, 19**.
- Mastro Benvenuto: Nicknamed Asdente ("toothless"), he was a late 13th-century Parma shoemaker, famous for his prophecies against **Frederick II**. Dante also mentions him with contempt in his Convivio, as does Salimbene in his Cronica, though with a very different tone.
  - Among the soothsayers. **Inf. XX, 118–120**.
- Saint Bernard of Clairvaux: 12th-century abbot, mystic, co-founder of the Knights Templar, and a major leader in the reformation of the Benedictine Order through the nascent Cistercian Order.
  - Guides Dante as he travels through the Empyrean. **Par. XXXI, 102**.
- Gualdrada Berti: Daughter of Bellincione Berti dei Ravignani, from about 1180 wife to Guido the Elder of the great Guidi family, and grandmother of **Guido Guerra**. The 14th-century Florentine chronicler Giovanni Villani remembers her as a model of ancient Florentine virtue.
  - "The good Gualdrada". **Inf. XVI, 37**.
- Bertran de Born (c. 1140 – c. 1215): French soldier and troubadour poet, and viscount of Hautefort, he fomented trouble between Henry II of England and his sons.
  - Among the sowers of discord, where he carries his severed head (although he died a natural death). **Inf. XXVIII, 118–142**.
  - "The lord of Hautefort." **Inf. XXIX, 29**.
- Bonagiunta of Lucca: Tuscan poet. He uses the phrase "dolce stil novo" to describe the poetry of Dante, Guido Guinizelli, and Guido Cavalcanti. **Purg. XXIV, 43–63**.
- Guido Bonatti: A prominent 13th-century astrologer, and a staunch **Ghibelline**, he is famous for having boasted of being responsible for the Senese victory at Montaperti in 1260.
  - Among the soothsayers. **Inf. XX, 118**.
- Bonaventure: Franciscan theologian.
  - He eulogised **St. Dominic**. **Par. XII, 31–105**.

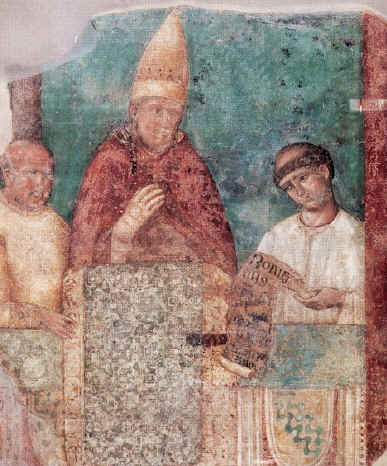
Pope Boniface VIII, fresco by Giotto di Bondone

- Buonconte: Son of military strategist **Guido da Montefeltro**, he helped expel the Guelph party from Arezzo in 1287. His army was defeated by Guelphs from Florence at the Battle of Campaldino in 1289. Dante fought for Florence in the battle. Buonconte's body was not found after the battle.
  - Dante encounters Buonconte waiting to enter Purgatory among the souls who died violent deaths and repented in the final moments. **Purg. V, 85–125**.
- Pope Boniface VIII (c. 1235–1303): Elected in 1294 upon the abdication of **Celestine V**, whom he promptly imprisoned. He supported the Black Guelphs against Dante's party the White Guelphs (see **Guelphs and Ghibellines**). He was in conflict with the powerful Colonna family, who contested the legitimacy of Celestine's abdication, and thus Boniface's papacy. Wishing to capture the impregnable Colonna stronghold of Palestrina, he sought advice from **Guido da Montefeltro**, offering in advance papal absolution for any sin his advice might entail. He advised Boniface to promise the Colonnas amnesty, then break it. As a result, the Collonas surrendered the fortress and it was razed to the ground.
  - "One who tacks his sails". **Inf. VI, 68**.
  - Referred to ironically using one of the official papal titles "servo de' servi" (Servant of His servants"). **Inf. XV, 112**
  - Accused of avarice, deceit and violating the "lovely Lady" (the church). **Inf. XIX, 52–57**.
  - **Pope Nicholas III** prophesies his eternal damnation among the **Simoniacs**. **Inf. XIX, 76–77**.
  - The "highest priest—may he be damned!". **Inf. XXVII, 70**.
  - The "prince of the new Pharisees". **Inf. XXVII, 85**.
  - His feud with the Colonna family and the advice of Guido da Montefeltro. **Inf. XXVII, 85–111**.
  - Treatment at the hands of Philip IV of France compared to a new crucifixion of **Jesus**. **Purg. XX, 85–93**.
- Guglielmo Borsiere, a pursemaker accused of sodomy (see **Sodom**), who made a joke that was the subject of the Decameron (i, 8).
  - A sodomite mentioned in the seventh circle, round 3 by **Jacopo Rusticucci** as having spoken to him and his companions of the moral decline of Florence, generating great anguish and inducing Rusticucci to ask Dante for corroboration. **Inf. XVI 67–72**.
- Martin Bottario: A cooper of **Lucca** who held various positions in the government of his city. He died in 1300, the year of Dante's travel.
  - Probably the "elder of **Saint Zita**" who is plunged into a lake of boiling pitch with the other **barrators** by a **Malebranche**. **Inf. XXI, 35–54**.
- Brennus: Gaulic king who invaded Rome and held the city for ransom in the 4th century BCE.
  - He was the last successful foreign invader of the city until the 5th century. **Par. VI, 44**.
- Briareus: Son of Uranus and Gaia and one of the Hekatonkheires ("hundred-handed")
  - Bound in the Well of the Giants in Hell. Dante asks Virgil to point him out. **Inf. XXXI, 97–105**.
  - Depicted on the pavement in Purgatory being hurled from Olympus as an exemplar of arrogance. **Purg. XII, 28**.
- Agnello Brunelleschi: From the noble Florentine Brunelleschi family, he sided first with the **White Guelphs**, then the Blacks. A famous thief, he was said to steal in disguise.
  - Among the thieves, he merges with **Cianfa Donati** to form a bigger serpent. **Inf. XXV, 68**.
- Brutus, Lucius Junius: Traditionally viewed as the founder of the Roman Republic, because of his role in overthrowing **Tarquin**, the last Roman king.
  - Seen in **Limbo**. **Inf. IV, 127**.
- Brutus, Marcus Junius (died 43 BCE): One of the assassins of **Julius Caesar**, with whom he had close ties. His betrayal of Caesar was famous ("Et tu Brute") and along with **Cassius** and **Judas**, was one of the three betrayer/suicides who, for those sins, were eternally chewed by one of the three mouths of **Satan**. **Inf. XXXIV, 53–67**.
- Bulicame: Spring near Viterbo renowned for its reddish colour and sulphurous water. Part of its water was reserved for the use of prostitutes. **Inf. XIV, 79–83**.

== C ==
- Caccia d'Asciano: See **Spendthrift Club**.
- Cacciaguida: Italian crusader and the great-great-grandfather of Dante Alighieri.
  - Among the Warriors of the Faith in the fifth sphere of heaven. **Par. XV, 135**.
- Venedico and Ghisolabella Caccianemico: Venedico (c. 1228 – c. 1302) was head of the Guelph faction in Bologna, he was exiled three times for his relationship with the marquess of Ferrara, **Obizzo II d'Este**.
  - Found among the panders, he confesses that he prostituted his sister Ghisolabella to **Obizzo**. **Inf. XVIII, 40–66**.
- Cacus: A mythological monster son of Hephaestus, he was killed by **Heracles** for stealing part of the cattle the hero had taken from **Geryon**. Dante, like other medieval writers, erroneously believes him to be a **Centaur**. According to **Virgil** he lived on the Aventine.
  - As guardian of the thieves he punishes **Vanni Fucci**. He is depicted as a centaur with a small dragon perched on his shoulder and snakes riding on his back. **Inf. XXV, 17–33**.

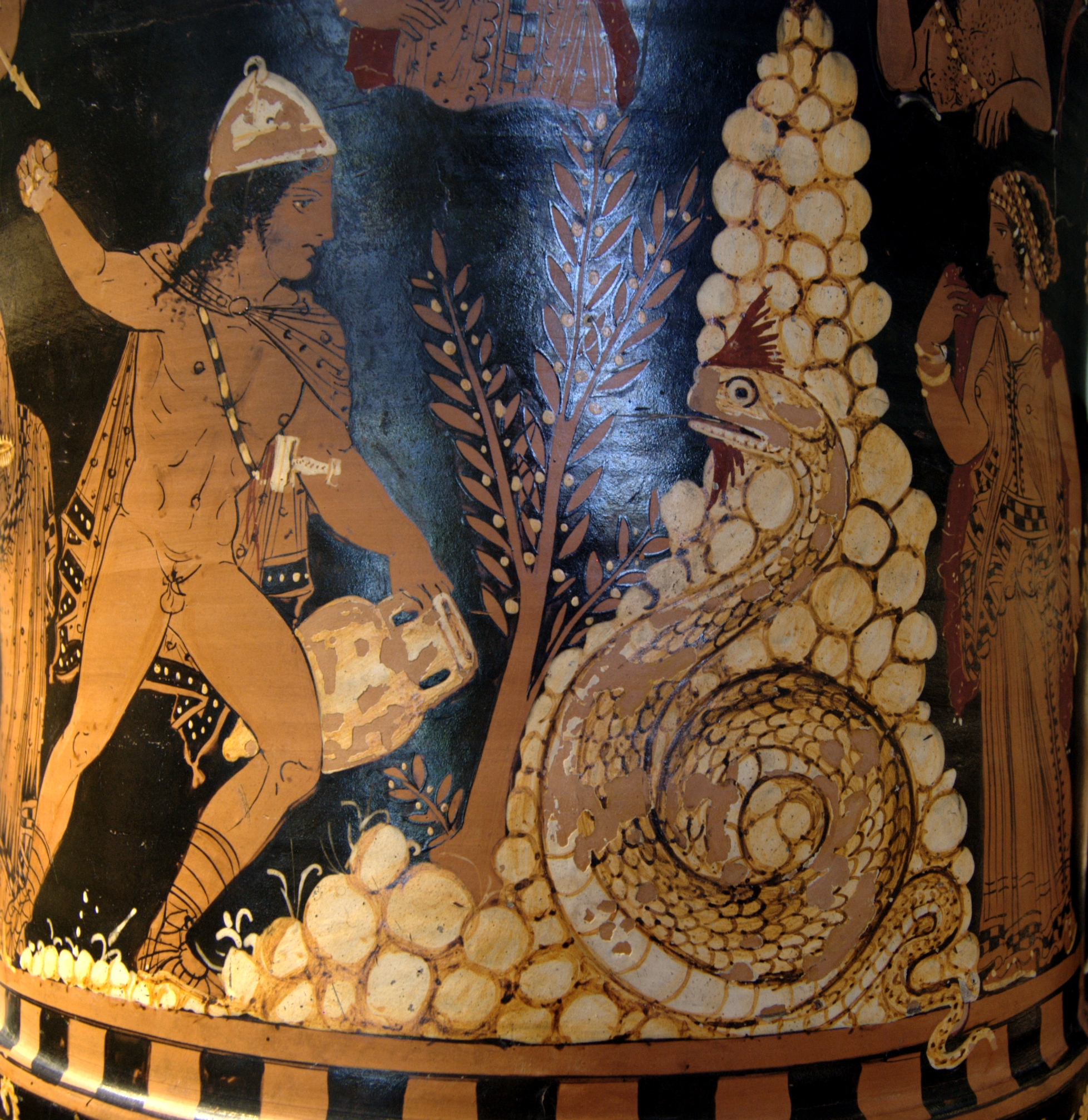
Cadmus fighting the dragon. Side A of a red-figured calix-krater found in Sant'Agata de' Goti (Campania), c. 350–340 BCE. From Paestum.

- Cadmus: Mythical son of the Phoenician king Agenor and brother of Europa, and legendary founder of Thebes. Cadmus and his wife Harmonia are ultimately transformed into serpents. (See also **Hera.**)
  - His transformation in **Ovid'**s Metamophoses (IV, 562–603) is compared to the fate of the thieves. **Inf. XXV, 97–99**.
- Caecilius: Roman poet of the 2nd century BCE.
  - Resident of **Limbo**. **Purg. XXII, 97**.
- Cahors: Town in France that was notorious for its Cahorsins, Christian financiers who engaged in **usury** that was then considered sinful.
  - Mentioned as being punished in the last circle. **Inf. XI, 50**.
- Cain: The son of **Adam** and brother of **Abel**. He murdered his brother out of envy.
  - A popular tradition identified the Moon's dark spots as the marks on Cain's face mentioned in Genesis 4:15. **Inf. XX, 126**, **Par. II, 49–51**.
  - The outermost ring of **Cocytus**, where the treacherous to kin are punished, is named Caïna. **Inf. XXXII, 58**.
  - He is an example of envy. His voice is heard on the terrace of the envious saying, "Everyone who finds me will slay me." (Gen 4:14) **Purg. XIV, 133**.
- Caiaphas: The Jewish High Priest during the governorship of Pontius Pilate of the Roman province of Judea, who according to the Gospels had an important role in the crucifixion of **Jesus**.
  - Among the hypocrites, his punishment is to be crucified to the ground while the full rank of the sinners tramples him. **Inf. XXIII, 110–120**.
- Calchas: Mythical Greek seer at the time of the Trojan war, who as augur at Aulis, determined the most propitious time for the Greek fleet to depart for **Troy**.
  - With **Eurypylus**, he "set the time to cut the cables". **Inf. XX, 110–111**.
- Calliope: The **Muse** of epic poetry.
  - Invoked by Dante at the beginning of the Purgatorio. **Purg. I, 9**.
- Camilla: Figure from Roman mythology and **Virgil'**s Aeneid (VII, 803; XI), was the warrior-daughter of King Metabus of the Volsci, and ally of **Turnus**, king of the Rutuli, against **Aeneas** and the **Trojans**, and was killed in that war.
  - One of those who "died for Italy". **Inf. I, 106–108**.
  - Seen in **Limbo**. **Inf. IV, 124**.
- Cangrande della Scala (1290–1329): **Ghibelline** ruler of Verona and most probable figure behind the image of the "hound" ("il Veltro"). **Inf. I, 101–111**.
- Capaneus: In Greek mythology, in the war of the Seven against Thebes, he defied **Zeus** who then killed him with a thunderbolt in punishment.
  - Found amongst the violent against God. **Inf. XIV, 46–72**.
  - His pride is compared with that of **Vanni Fucci**. **Inf. XXV, 15**.
- Capocchio: Burned at the stake for alchemy in 1293.
  - Among the "falsifiers" of metal (alchemists), sitting with **Griffolino of Arezzo**, propping each other up, as they frantically scratch at the scabs covering their bodies. **Inf. XXIX, 73–99**.
  - Agrees with Dante about the vanity of the Sienese, giving as examples four of the members of the Sienese **Spendthrift Club**, then identifies himself. **Inf. XXIX, 124–139**.
  - He is dragged, with his belly scraped along the ground, by the tusks of **Schicchi**. **Inf. XXX, 28–30**.
- Caprona: Fortress on the Arno near Pisa, in 1289, it was besieged by a Tuscan **Guelph** army. The **Ghibellines** surrendered, and were allowed, under truce, to leave the castle, passing through (with trepidation) the enemy ranks. Caprona's fall along with the Guelph victory in the same year at Campaldino represented the final defeat of the **Ghibellines**. Dante's reference to Caprona in the Inferno, is used to infer that he took part in the siege.
  - Dante's fear for his safe passage through threatening devils, is compared to the fear of the surrendering soldiers at Caprona. **Inf. XXI, 88–96**.
- Cardinal Virtues: The foundations of a moral life, attainable by all, regardless of religion. They include Prudence, Temperance, Justice, and Fortitude.
  - They appear symbolically as four stars visible from Purgatory. **Purg. I, 37; VIII, 91**.
  - Virgil defines Prudence as "the power that counsels and keeps the threshold of assent." **Purg. XVIII, 62–63**.
- Casella: Florentine composer and singer (died before 1300) and friend of Dante's, who set at least one poem from Dante's Convivio to music. **Purg. II**.
- Cassius: The most senior of **Julius Caesar'**s assassins, Gaius Cassius Longinus was a Roman politician and soldier.
  - Along with **Brutus** and **Judas**, he was one of the three betrayer/suicides who, for those sins, were eternally chewed by one of the three mouths of **Satan**. **Inf. XXXIV, 53–67**.
- Castel Sant'Angelo: A Papal castle in Rome with bridge attached. **Inf. XVIII, 28–33**.
- Catalano dei Malavolti (c. 1210–1285): From a powerful **Guelph** family of Bologna, he was podestà in several towns, including Florence, and governor of his city. He was commander of the infantry in the Battle of Fossalta in 1249, when the Ghibellines suffered a crushing defeat. He later became a member of the Knights of St. Mary, founded by **Loderingo degli Andalò**.
  - Among the hypocrites. **Inf. XXIII, 76–144**.
- Catiline: a Roman politician of the 1st century BCE who is best known for the "Catiline conspiracy", an attempt to overthrow the Roman Republic, and in particular the power of the aristocratic Senate.
  - Probably **Pistoia'**s "seed", which Pistoia surpasses in "wickedness". **Inf. XXV, 12**.
- Cato the Younger (95–46 BCE) : Politician and statesman in the late Roman Republic, and a Stoic.
  - His crossing of the Libyan desert in 47 BCE provides a simile for the hot sands of the seventh circle. **Inf. XIV, 14–15**.
  - The "patriarch" who resides at the base of Mount Purgatory and functions as gate-keeper for Purgatory. **Purg. I, 31**.
- Cavalcante de' Cavalcanti: (died c. 1280) Father of **Guido Cavalcanti**, his shade appears to Dante, alongside the shade of **Farinata degli Uberti**. **Inf. X 52–72**.
- Guido Cavalcanti (c. 1255–1300): First Florentine poet of Dolce Stil Novo, close friend of Dante and son of **Cavalcante de' Cavalcanti**. **Inf. X, 56–63, Purg. XI, 97–98**.
- Francesco de' Cavalcanti: Nicknamed Guercio ("one-eyed" or "squinter"), he was murdered for unknown reasons by the inhabitants of the village of Gaville, near Florence. Reportedly his death started a bloody feud between his family and the villagers, leaving most of the inhabitants of Galville dead.
  - Among the thieves, as a "blazing little serpent", he attacks the soul of **Buoso Donati**, causing it to transform into a serpent, and himself to transform back into human form. **Inf. XXV, 82–151**.
- Cecina: See **Maremma**.
- Pope Celestine V: A hermit named Pietro da Morrone, he abdicated the Papacy in 1294 after only five months. His successor, **Boniface VIII**, immediately jailed him and two years later apparently murdered him.
  - Is perhaps the person whose shade Dante meets in the Ante-Inferno, where those who lived "sanza 'nfamia e sanza lodo" (without praise and blame) dwelt, and referred to as the one, "Che fece per viltate il gran rifiuto" (who made, through cowardice, the great refusal). **Inf. III, 60**.
  - Of whom Boniface says, "I possess the power to lock and unlock Heaven; for the keys my predecessor did not prise are two". '**Inf. XXVII, 105**.
- Centaurs: In Greek mythology, a race part Man and part horse, with a horse's body and a human head and torso.
  - Supervising the punishment of the violent. Their leader **Chiron** appoints one of their number, **Nessus**, to guide the poets. **Inf. XII, 55–139**.
  - The only one not with the violent is **Cacus**, who supervises the thieves. **Inf. XXV, 28–30**.
  - Cited as examples of gluttony in Purgatory by a voice hidden in a tree of temptation, because of their drunken behavior at the marriage feast of Hippodamia. **Purg. XXIV, 121–123**.
- Ceperano: See **Apulia**.

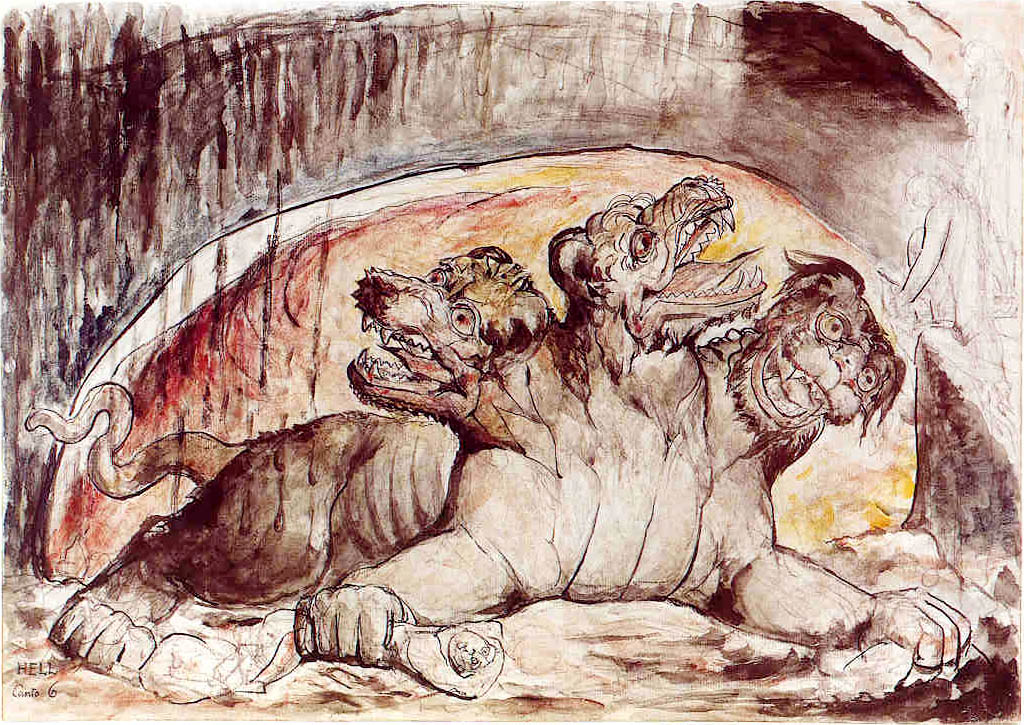
Cerberus, picture by William Blake (18th century)

- Cerberus: In Greek mythology, he was the three-headed dog who guarded the gate to Hades. In the Aeneid, **Virgil** has the Sibyl throw a drugged honey cake into Cerberus' mouths; in the Inferno, Dante has Virgil throw dirt instead.
  - Encountered In the third circle. **Inf. VI, 13–33**.
  - Example of divine punishment. **Inf. IX, 98**.
- Cesena: City on the Savio River during Dante's time, though free, its politics were controlled by **Guido da Montefeltro'**s cousin Galasso da Montefeltro. **Inf. XXVII, 52–54**.
- Charles the Lame: Son of **Charles of Anjou** and King of Naples (1285–1309)
  - Forced to marry off his daughters "like slaves" for political alliances. **Purg. XX, 79–81**.
- Charles of Anjou (also Charles I of Sicily) (1227–1285): Son of Louis VIII of France, he was one of the most powerful rulers of his age and the undisputed head of the **Guelph** faction in Italy. His dream of building a Mediterranean Empire was wrecked by the Sicilian Vespers.
  - Dante probably alludes to the Byzantine money that it was believed **Nicholas III** had taken with the promise to hinder Charles' plans against Constantinople. **Inf. XIX, 98–99**.
  - Defeated Conradin at Tagliacozzo in 1268 and became King of Sicily. **Purg. XX, 68**.
  - According to Dante, responsible for the death of Thomas Aquinas. **Purg. XX, 69**.
- Charles of Valois: (1270–1325) Second son of Philip III of France. Invaded Italy and took Florence in 1301, placing the **Black Guelphs** in power. Subsequently, Dante was exiled from Florence.
  - Compared to **Judas**. **Purg. XX, 70–78**.
- Charybdis: In Greek mythology, a sea monster who swallows huge amounts of water three times a day and then spouts it back out again, forming an enormous whirlpool. Mentioned frequently by classical writers.
  - Used in a simile to describe the punishment of the greedy and prodigal in the fourth circle. **Inf. VII, 22**.
- Charon: The mythological Greek figure who ferried souls of the newly dead into Hades over the underworld river Acheron. **Inf. III, 82–129**.
- Chiron: Leader of the **centaurs**, legendary tutor of **Achilles**. **Inf. XII, 65**.
- Ciacco ("pig"): Nickname, for a Florentine contemporary of Dante, perhaps well known as a glutton, and probably the same who appears in Boccaccio's Decameron (IX, 8).
  - Central figure of canto VI, he voices the first of many prophecies concerning Florence. **Inf. VI, 37–99**.
- Ciampolo di Navarra: Utterly unknown to sources other than Dante, this Ciampolo (i.e. Jean Paul) appears to have been in the service of **Theobald II**, king of Navarre.
  - Among the **barrators**. **Inf. XXII, 31–129**.
- Cianghella della Tosa: 14th-century Florentian woman. She was born into the Florentine Della Tosa family and married into the Alidosi family of Imola, near Bologna.
  - Listed as an example of the corrupt nature of Florentine citizens in his time, in contrast to the virtue of the idealized Florence in Cacciaguida's time. **Par. XV, 128**.
- Cicero, Marcus Tullius (c. 106 – c. 43 BCE): Roman statesman and author.
  - Encountered by Dante in **Limbo**. **Inf. IV, 141**.
- Cimabue: Florentine painter (c. 1240–1302)
  - Mentioned in Purgatory as a famous painter. **Purg. XI, 94**.
- Circe: Mythical daughter of Helios, god of the Sun, and sister of Aeetis, king of Colchis. She was an enchantress who lived near the Gulf of Gaeta, who turned the crew of **Odysseus** into pigs on their journey home from the **Trojan war**. But Odysseus, with the help of Hermes, forced her to release his men from her spell (Ovid, Met. XIV, 435–440). She fell in love with Odysseus and he stayed with her for another year and in some accounts, she had a son Telegonus with Odysseus, who was to accidentally kill him.
  - It is said, by Ulysses (Odysseus), that she "beguiled" him. **Inf. XXVI, 90–92**.
  - The people of Tuscany fall into vice, as if under her spell. **Purg. XIV, 42**.
- Cirra: Town in ancient Greece near Parnassus. **Par. I, 36**.
- Pope Clement V (1264–1314): Born in France as Bertran de Goth, he was made archbishop of Bordeaux by **Pope Boniface VIII**. He was elected pope in 1305 and was remarkable for his dissolution of the Templars and his de facto move of the Papal See from Rome to Avignon (See Avignon Papacy). He was thought to have negotiated with **Philip IV of France** for his papacy, becoming a puppet of the French monarchy.
  - "One uglier in deeds ... a lawless shepherd from the west", whose damnation among the **Simoniacs** is foretold by **Pope Nicholas III**. **Inf. XIX, 79–87**.

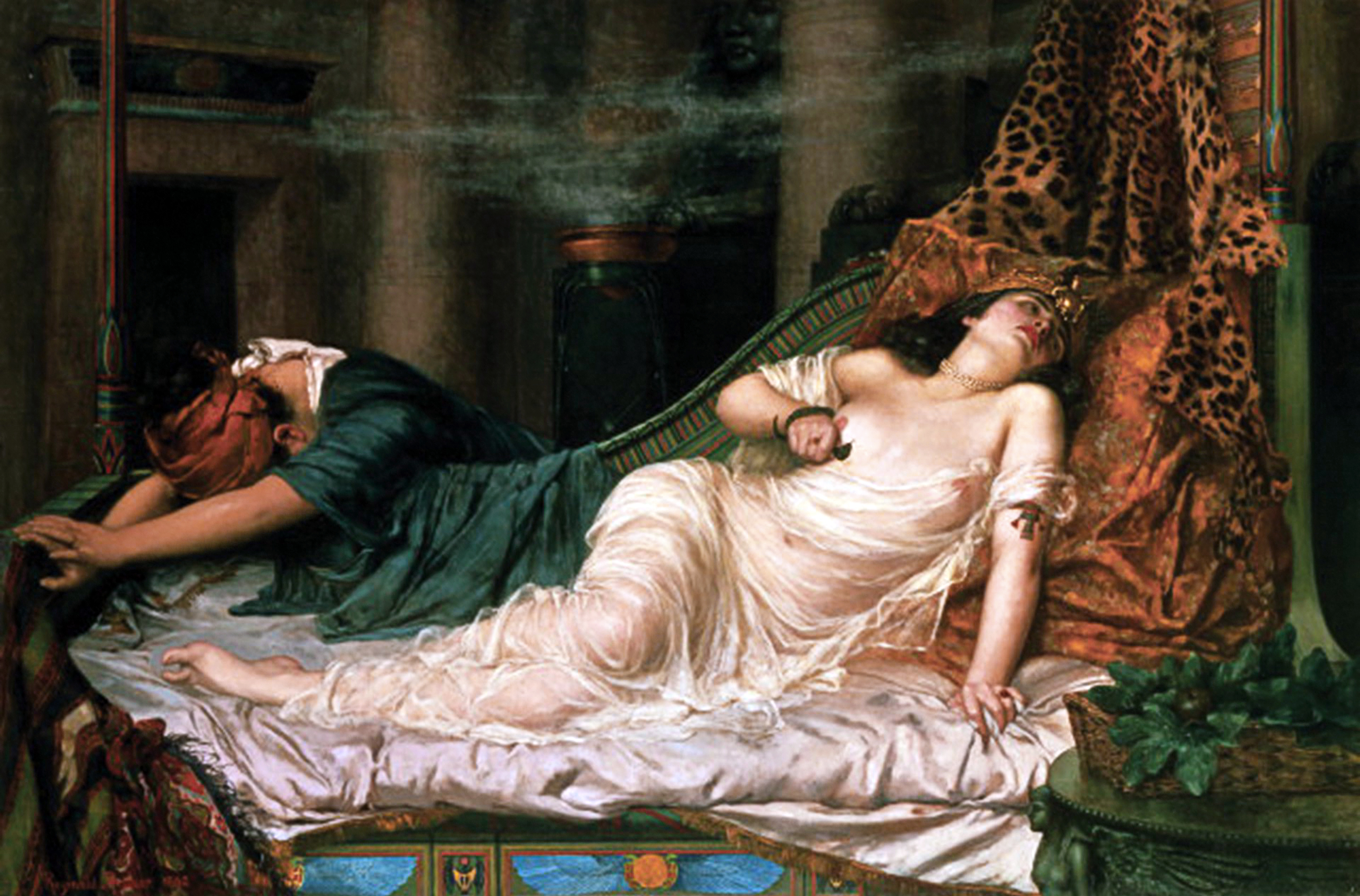
The Death of Cleopatra by Reginald Arthur, Roy Miles Gallery, London

- Cleopatra (69–30 BCE): Queen of Egypt, lover of **Julius Caesar** and Mark Antony. Like **Dido**, she "killed herself for love".
  - Found amongst the sexual sinners. **Inf. V, 63**.
- Clio: The **Muse** of History.
  - Mentioned by Virgil as **Statius'** inspiration in writing the Thebaid. **Purg. XXII, 58**.
- Clotho: The Fate who determines the lifespan of each mortal by measuring out thread and then cutting it.
  - Virgil cites her as the reason Dante is yet alive. **Purg. XXI, 25–27**.
- Cluny: A Benedictine monastery founded in 909, in Burgundy. The elegant robes of the Cluniacs are described with irony in a letter of **Saint Bernard**, a Cistercian, to his nephew Robert, who had left the Cistercians to join the Cluniacs.
  - The "cloaks and cowls" of the hypocrites are compared to the Cluniac robes. **Inf. XXIII, 61–63**.
- Cocytus: "The river of lamentation", in Greek mythology, it was the river on whose banks the dead who could not pay **Charon** wandered. It flowed into the river Acheron, across which lay Hades. In the Inferno it is a frozen lake forming the ninth circle and the bottom of Hell.
  - Formed from the tears of the statue of the Old Man of Crete. **Inf. XIV, 94–120**.
  - Is shut in by cold. **Inf. XXXI, 121–122**.
  - Described. **Inf. XXXII, 22–39**.
  - Frozen by flapping of the wings of **Dis**. **Inf. XXXIV, 46–52**.
- Colchis: Ancient kingdom at the eastern end of the Black Sea. According to ancient Greek legend, Jason and the Argonauts sailed there in search of the Golden Fleece.
  - Dante compares the voyage to his journey through the heavens. **Par. II, 16–18**.
- Conradin: (1252–1258) King of Sicily until 1258, when he was defeated and deposed by **Charles of Anjou**. **Purg. XX, 68**.

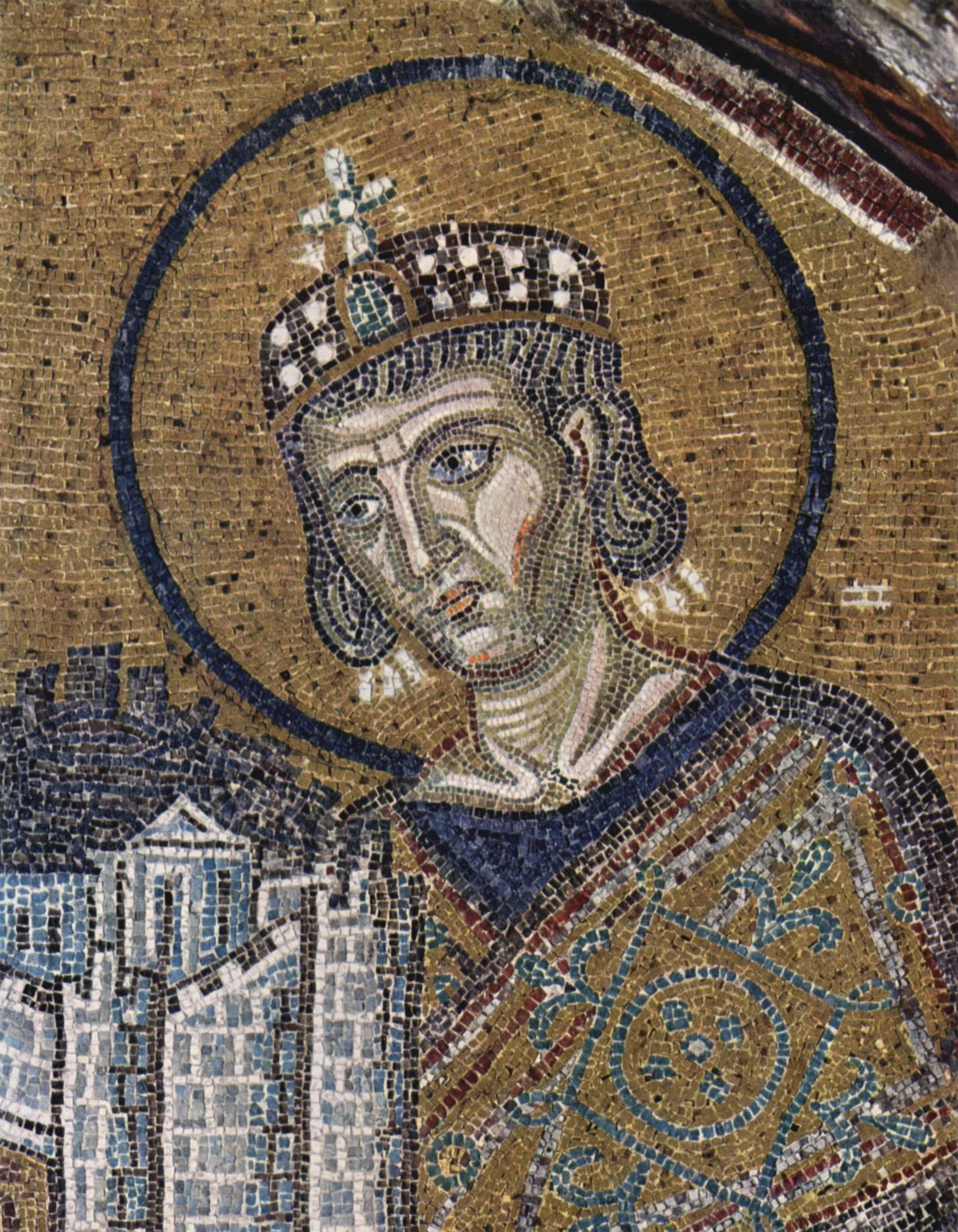
Constantine the Great (mosaic in Hagia Sophia, Constantinople, c. 1000)

- Constance (Constanza): Queen of Sicily in the 12th century and mother of Emperor Frederick II.
  - Dante accepts a story that Constance had taken monastic vows and was later forced to renounce them. She appears among the inconstant in the Heaven of the Moon. **Par. III, 109–120**.
- Constantine the Great (272–337): The famous Roman Emperor who passed the Edict of Milan in 313 and converted to Christianity. According to medieval legend, Constantine was inflicted with leprosy because of his persecution of Christians, and in a dream was told to seek out **Pope Silvester** on Mount Soracte, who baptised and cured him. According to the forged document, the Donation of Constantine, Constantine gave to the Pope the power to rule over Rome and the Western Roman Empire, which Dante sees as the source of the corruption of the Papacy.
  - Blamed for "the dower that you bestowed upon the first rich father!", **Inf. XIX, 115–117**.
  - **Guido da Montefeltro** compares Silvester being sought by Constantine to cure his leprosy, with himself being sought by **Boniface** to "ease the fever of his arrogance". **Inf. XXVII, 94–95**.
  - In converting to Christianity, Constantine reversed the flight of the Roman **Eagle**. **Par. VI, 1**.
- Cornelia Africana (c. 190–100 BCE): daughter of Scipio Africanus Major, and mother of Tiberius and Gaius Gracchus.
  - Encountered by Dante in **Limbo**. **Inf. IV, 128**.
- Corneto: See **Maremma**.
- Cronus: In Greek mythology, King of Crete during the Golden Age. He had several children by Rhea, but swallowed them at birth because he had learned from his parents Gaia and Uranus, that he was destined to be overthrown by a son. However, Rhea managed to save **Zeus** who eventually fulfilled that prophecy.
  - Under his rule, the world lived chastely". **Inf. XIV, 96**.
  - Rhea protects Zeus from him. **Inf. XIV, 100–102**
- Crassus: Roman general who amassed the largest fortune in Roman history. He died in a battle with the Parthians. A story later circulated that the Parthians poured molten gold into his mouth.
  - Cited on the terrace of the greedy as an example of greed. "Tell us, Crassus, because you know: How does gold taste?" **Purg. XX, 116–117**.
- Cunizza da Romano (1198–c. 1279): sister of Ezzelino III da Romano. **Par. IX, 13–66.**
- Gaius Scribonius Curio: A distinguished orator, and supporter of Pompey the Great, he switched his support to **Julius Caesar** after Caesar paid his debts. Lucan (Phars I 270–290) has Curio urge Caesar persuasively, to quickly cross the Rubicon and invade Rome.
  - Among the sowers of discord, he is pointed out by **Pier da Medincina**, his tongue having been slit, "who once was so audacious in his talk!". **Inf. XXVIII, 91–111**.
- Cyclops: Children of Uranus and Gaia, they were giants with a single eye in the middle of their forehead. In Roman mythology, they helped **Vulcan** make thunderbolts for **Zeus**.
  - The "others" who Zeus "may tire" making thunderbolts. **Inf. XIV, 55**.
- Cytherea: Alternative name for Aphrodite or **Venus**, the goddess of love. Also, the planet Venus.
  - In his last night in Purgatory, Dante dreams as the planet is rising. **Purg. XXVII, 94–96**.

== D ==
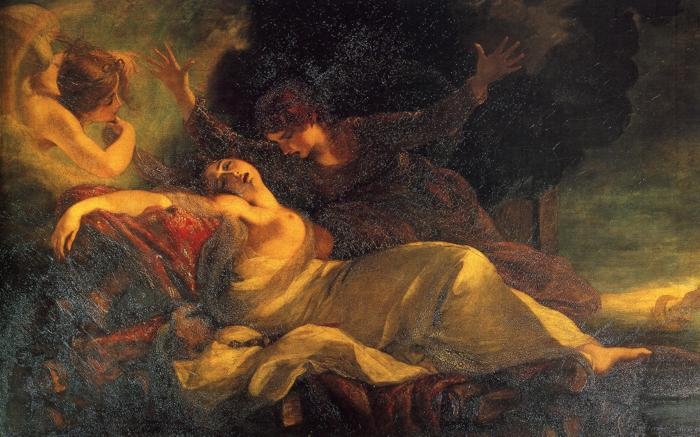
The Death of Dido by Joshua Reynolds 1781

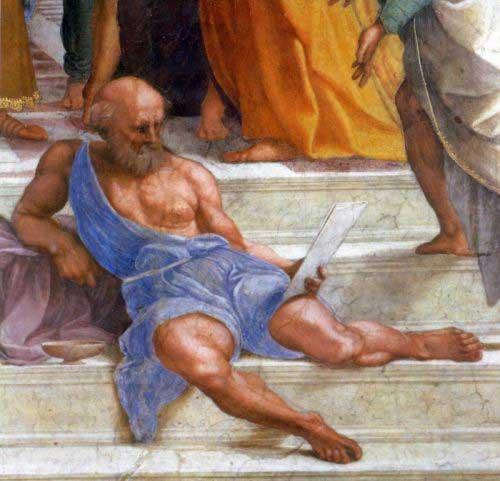
Diogenes, Detail of Rafaello Santi's The School of Athens (1510), Vatican collection

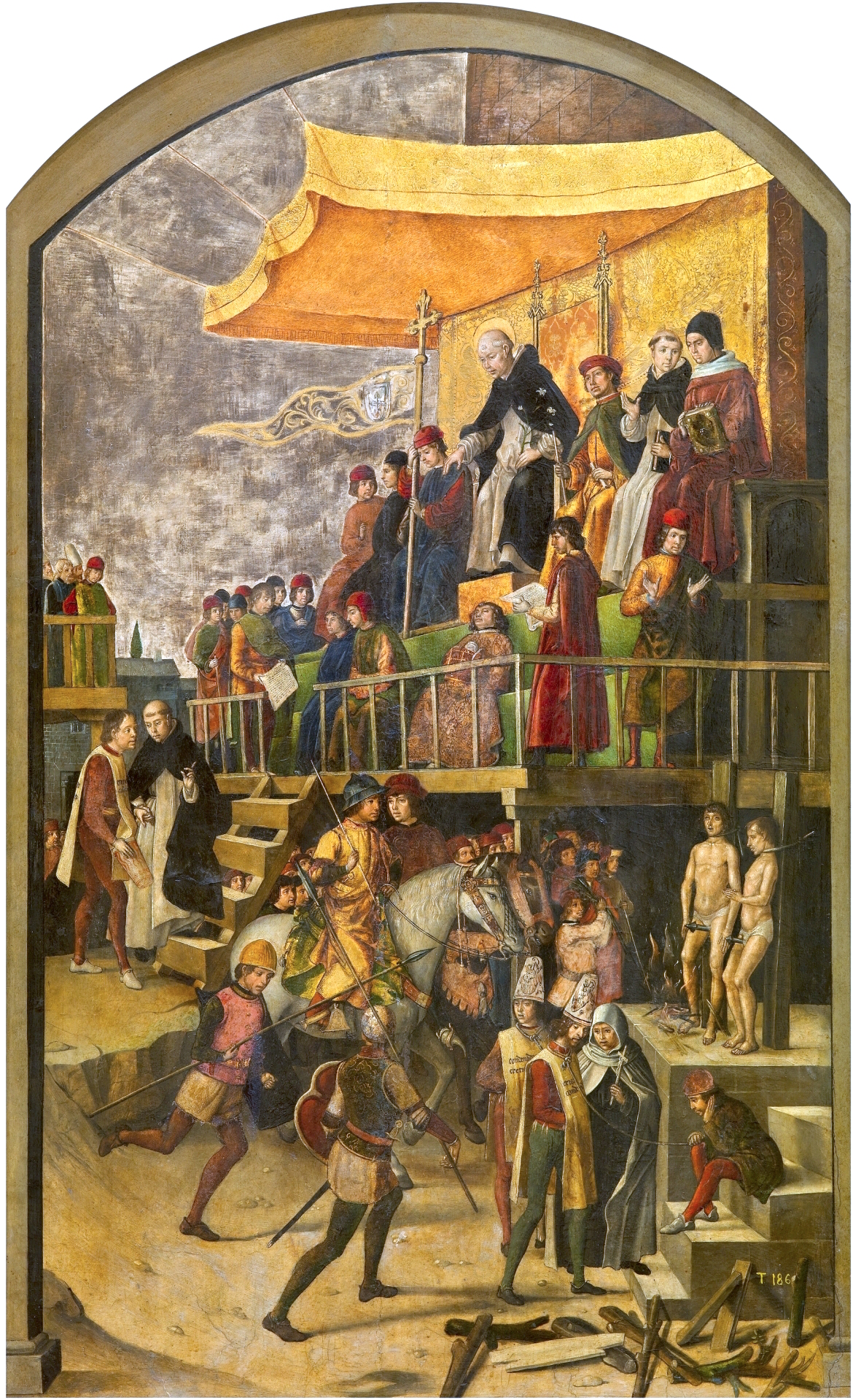
Saint Dominic presiding over an auto de fe, Pedro Berruguete, 1475

- Daedalus: In Greek mythology, he was a legendary inventor and craftsman. He designed the Labyrinth, and fashioned wings for himself and his son **Icarus**, enabling them to fly.
  - Mentioned by **Griffolino of Arezzo**. **Inf. XXIX, 116**.
- Daniel: Protagonist in the Book of Daniel of the Hebrew Bible. He and his companions fasted rather than incur ritual defilement when they ate in the court of the king of Babylon.
  - A voice in Purgatory cites Daniel as an example in the virtue of temperance. **Purg. XXII, 146–147**.
  - Dante compares Beatrice's solution of his mental doubts to Daniel's solution of Nebuchadnezzar's troubled dream in the biblical book of Daniel. **Par. IV, 13–15**.
- Danube: European river flowing through much of central and southeastern Europe.
  - **Cocytus** is compared to the Danube when frozen during the wintertime. **Inf. XXXII, 26**.
- Bonturo Dati (died 1324): Head of the popular faction in **Lucca**, he expelled his enemies in 1308 assuming the government of the city, boasting he would put an end to **barratry**. He is famous for provoking with his jeers in 1313 a war with Pisa, that has been remembered in Faida di Comune by Giosuè Carducci.
  - Sarcastically and ironically said that all Luccans but he are guilty of barratry. **Inf. XXI, 41**.
- King David: Biblical king of the Jews. His counselor **Ahithophel**, incited David's son **Absalom** against him.
  - Raised by **Jesus** from **Limbo** into Paradise. **Inf. IV, 58**.
  - His son's rebellion, and the urgings of Ahithophel is compared by **Bertran de Born** to his own urgings of Prince Henry against his father Henry II of England. **Inf. XXVIII, 134–138**.
  - Appears depicted in a wall carving as the "humble psalmist," leading the procession of the Ark to **Jerusalem**. **Purg. X, 64**.
- Decii: Three generations of men in a Patrician Roman family, who each answered the call to arms and died in battle.
  - Mentioned as exemplars of Roman virtue in the days of the Roman Republic. **Par. VI, 47**.
- Deianira: Wife of **Heracles**, she was abducted by the **centaur** **Nessus**, but Heracles shot him with a poisoned arrow. She was tricked by the dying Nessus into believing that a love potion could be made from his blood, which she later gives to Heracles poisoning him. **Inf. XII, 68**.
- Deidamia: Mythical daughter of Lycomedes, king of Scyros, she gave birth to **Achilles'** only son, **Pyrrhus Neoptolemus**, but died of grief when, because of the urgings of **Odysseus** (Ulysses), Achilles left her to go to the war against **Troy**.
  - Even dead she laments Achilles still. **Inf. XXVI, 61–62**.
  - Resident of **Limbo**. **Purg. XXII, 113**.
- Deipyle: Ancient Greek wife of Tydeus and mother of Diomedes.
  - Resident of Limbo. **Purg. XXII, 110**.
- "Delectasti": ("Quia delectasti me, Domine, in factura tua": "For thou hast given me, O Lord, a delight in thy doings.") Psalm 92:5 (91:5 in the Latin Vulgate)
  - Quoted by **Matilda** as the reason she smiled broadly at Dante in **Terrestrial Paradise**. **Purg. XXVIII, 76–81**.
- Democritus (c. 460–370 BCE): Pre-Socratic Greek philosopher.
  - Encountered by Dante in **Limbo**, "che 'l mondo a caso pone" ("who ascribes the world to chance"). **Inf. IV, 136**.
- "Deus, venerunt gentes": ("O God, the heathen have come.") Incipit of Psalm 79 (Psalm 78 in the Vulgate)
  - Chanted as a lamentation over the Church by the women representing the **Three Theological Virtues** and **Cardinal Virtues**. **Purg. XXXIII, 1–6**.
- Diana: Greco-Roman goddess, known as the "virgin goddess."
  - Cited as an example of sexual abstinence by souls on the terrace of the lustful. **Purg. XXV, 130–132**.
- Dido: Queen of Carthage. In **Virgil'**s Aeneid, she becomes the lover of **Aeneas** despite a vow of eternal fidelity to her dead husband Sichaeus. Consequently, as "colei, che s' ancise amorosa" (she who killed herself from love"), Dante places her amongst the sexual sinners. **Inf. V, 61–62**.
- Diogenes of Sinope (c. 412–323 BCE): Greek philosopher.
  - Encountered by Dante in **Limbo**. **Inf. IV, 137**.
- Diomedes: Mythical king of Argus, he participated in the expedition against **Troy**, where his prowess is extolled in the Iliad. A great friend of **Odysseus** (Ulysses), he was his companion in many feats, most notably the theft of Troy's **Palladium** and the ruse of the Trojan Horse.
  - Among the advisors of fraud, he is punished with Ulysses for the sins they both committed at Troy. **Inf. XXVI, 52–63**.
- Dionysius the Areopagite (fl. c. 50): Athenian judge who was converted to Christianity and became a bishop of Athens. As was common in the Middle Ages, Dante has confused him with Pseudo-Dionysius, the anonymous 5th-century author of Celestial Hierarchy.
  - Identified in the Heaven of the Sun by **Thomas Aquinas**. **Par. X, 115–117**.
- Dionysius the Elder: Tyrant of Syracuse (405–367 BCE).
  - Pointed out by **Nessus**. **Inf. XII, 107–108**.
- Pedanius Dioscorides (c. 40 – c. 90): Greek physician and author of a work on the medicinal properties of plants, hence Dante's description of him as "il buono accoglitor del quale"/"the good collector of the qualities".
  - Encountered by Dante in **Limbo**. **Inf. IV, 139–140**.
- Dis: Another name for Pluto, the Roman god of the underworld, used by Dante as both the name of **Satan** and his realm.
  - First glimpse of the "crimson" city. **Inf VIII, 67–75**.
  - Dante refused entry. **Inf VIII, 76–130**.
  - The city dolente (of sorrowing). **Inf IX, 32**.
  - Entrance. **Inf IX, 73–133**.
  - Spoils taken from by **Jesus**. **Inf. XII, 38–39**.
  - Pointed out by **Virgil**. **Inf. XXXIV, 20**.
- Fra Dolcino: In 1300 he headed the Apostolic Brothers, a reformist order which, inspired by the example of **St. Francis** renounced all worldly possessions. He and his followers were condemned as heretics by **Clement V**, and fled into the hills near Novara. Facing starvation they surrendered and Dolcino was burned at the stake in 1307.
  - Among the "sowers of dissension", **Muhammad**, says to Dante: "tell Fra Dolcino to provide himself with food, if he has no desire to join me here quickly". **Inf. XXVIII, 22–63**.
- Saint Dominic: Founder of the Dominican Order.
  - He is eulogised by **Bonaventure**. **Par. XII, 31–105**.
- Domitian: Roman Emperor (81–96). His religious policies resulted in persecution of Christians and Jews.
  - **Statius** relates how witnessing the persecution helped to convert him to Christianity. **Purg. XXII, 82–87**.
- Buoso Donati: Of the noble Florentine **Black Guelph** Donati family, he was one of those who accepted the peace between the factions proposed by Cardinal Latino in 1280. He died around 1285.
  - Among the thieves, he is transformed into a serpent by **Francesco de' Cavalcanti**. **Inf. XXV, 82–151**.
  - His impersonation by **Gianni Schicchi** described. **Inf. XXX, 43–45**.
- Cianfa Donati: Of the Donati family, he is known to have acted as advisor to the Capitano del popolo in 1281. In 1289 he is reported as already dead.
  - Among the thieves, he appears as a six-footed serpent, attacks and melds with **Agnello Brunelleschi**. **Inf. XXV, 43–78**.
- Forese Donati (?–1296): A Florentine poet, friend of Dante, and relative of Dante's wife, Gemma Alighieri.
  - Among the gluttons, he predicts disaster for Florence and for his brother, Corso Donati. **Purg. XXIII, 42 – XXIV, 99.**
  - Notes that the prayers of his surviving wife Nella have greatly reduced his stay in Purgatory. **Purg. XXIII, 76–93.**
- Piccarda Donati: Sister of Forese Donanti, already dead at the time setting of the Comedy.
  - In Purgatory, Dante asks Forese Donati where his dead sister is and learns that she is "in triumph." **Purg. XXIV, 10–16.**
- Dragon
  - Allegorical representation of the Islamic conquests of Christian territory in the **Pageant of Church History**. **Purg. XXXII, 130–135**.

== E ==
- Eagle: Bird which appeared on the Standard of the Roman Legions and symbolized the authority of the empire.
  - An **Eagle** appears twice in the **Pageant of Church History**. It first represents the persecution of the early Church by the Roman Empire. **Purg. XXXII, 109–117**. Then it returns, representing connection of the Church and Empire starting with the Emperor Constantine I. **Purg. XXXII, 124–129**.
  - The administration of justice is dispensed in the form of an **Eagle** which appears in **Par. XVIII** and answers Dante in **Par. XIX** and **Par. XX** on the matter of whether any who are not Christian can be saved.
- Ebro: River in Spain.
  - Used as a reference to the time of day. Dante considered it to be 6 hours ahead of Purgatory. **Purg. XXVII, 2–3**.
- Ecce ancilla Dei: "Behold the handmaid of God." (In the original Vulgate: "Ecce ancilla Domini.") Response of the **Virgin Mary** to the angel Gabriel when he announced that she would be the mother of **Jesus**.
  - Words seen in a wall-carving depicting the Annunciation. It is a visual representation of humility. **Purg. X, 44**.

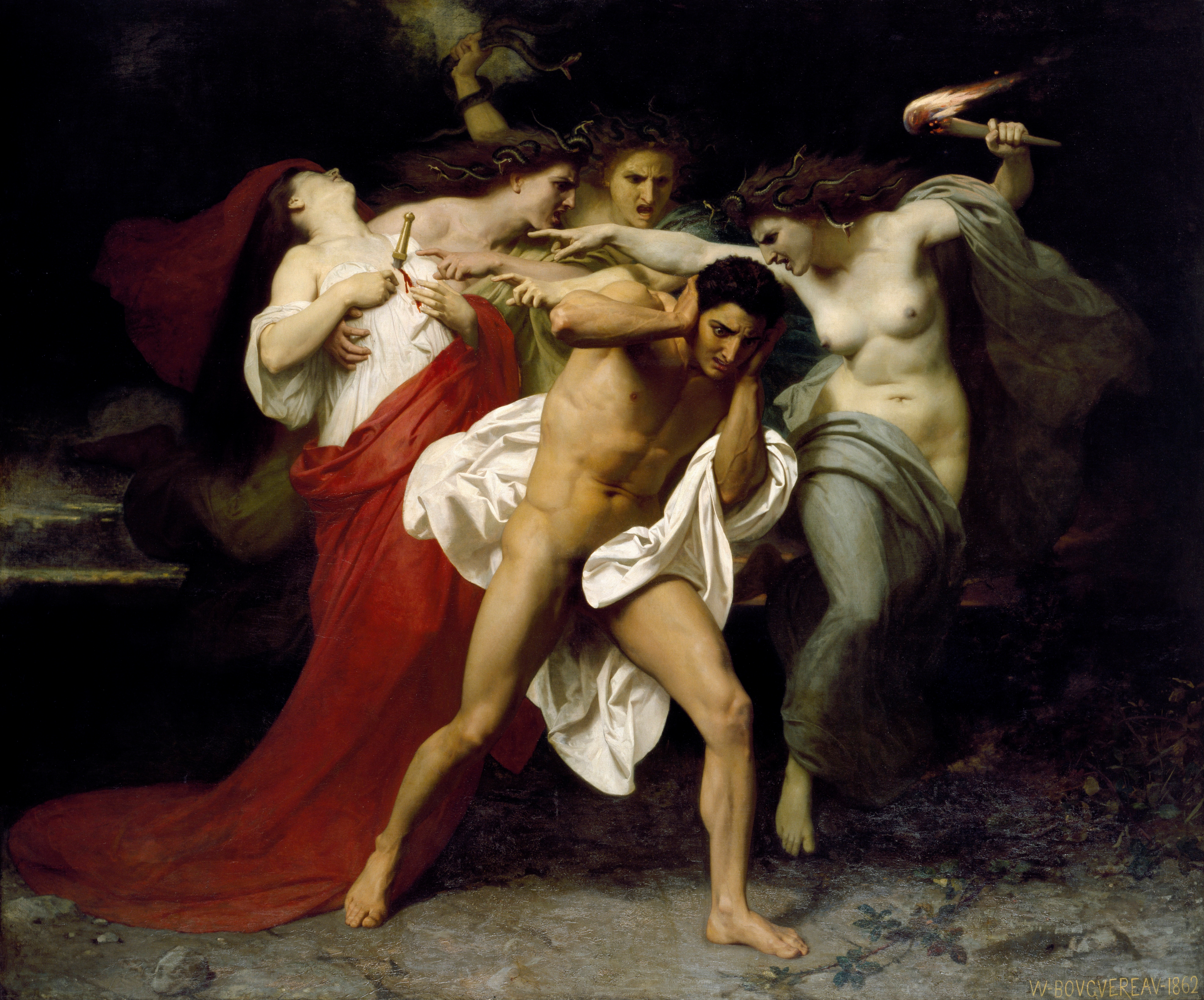
The Furies hector Orestes, in Orestes Pursued by the Furies by William-Adolphe Bouguereau 1862

- Electra: Mother of Dardanus founder of **Troy** and ancestor of **Aeneas**.
  - Seen in **Limbo** with "her many comrades". **Inf. IV, 121–128**.
- Elijah and Elisha: Elijah was an Old Testament Biblical Prophet who ascends into heaven in a chariot of fire, and Elisha was his disciple and chosen successor who witnessed Elijah's ascent. Elisha curses some youths for ridiculing him, who are then eaten by bears (2 Kings 2:23–24; 11–12)
  - Elijah's fiery ascent, as witnessed by "he who was avenged by bears" (Elisha), is described. **Inf. XXVI, 34–39**.
- Empedocles (c. 490 – c. 430 BCE): Greek Presocratic philosopher.
  - Encountered by Dante in **Limbo**. **Inf. IV, 138**.
- England: see **Anglo-Scottish War**
- Ephialtes: Son of Poseidon and Iphimedeia, Ephialtes was a giant who attempted to scale Mt. Olympus by piling mountains on each other.
  - Seen chained in the "Well of the Giants." **Inf. XXXI, 82–111.**
- Epicurus was an Ancient Greek philosopher who was the founder of Epicureanism, one of the most popular schools of Hellenistic Philosophy, which had many followers among Florentine Guibellines. His teaching that the greatest pleasure is merely the absence of pain was viewed as heresy in Dante's day because this greatest good could be attained without reference to a god or an afterlife.
  - Epicurean heretics and their punishment. **Inf. X**.
- Erard de Valéry: See **Tagliacozzo**.
- Erichtho: According to a story in **Lucan'**s Pharsalia, she was a sorceress sent to the underworld by **Sextus Pompeius** to divine the outcome of the upcoming battle of Pharsalia between his father, Pompey the Great, and **Julius Caesar**.
  - She sent Virgil to the innermost circle of hell not long after his death. **Inf. IX, 22–29**.
- Erinyes: (also known as the Furies). In Greek mythology, they were Alecto, Megaera, and Tisiphone, three female personifications of vengeance.
  - They appear and threaten Dante with the head of the **Medusa**. **Inf. IX, 34–72**.
- Erysichthon: Ancient King of Thessaly who cut down a grove of trees sacred to Demeter. Her revenge was to give him insatiable hunger which eventually caused him to consume his own flesh.
  - Seeing fasting souls in Purgatory on the terrace of the gluttonous, Dante is reminded of Erysichthon's story. **Purg. XXIII, 25–27**.
- Eteocles and Polynices: Mythical sons of Oedipus and Jocasta, they succeeded their father as kings of Thebes. Eteocles' refusal to share the throne led to the war of the Seven against Thebes, in which the two brothers killed each other. Their enmity in life was such that **Statius** (Thebais XII, 429 ff.) says even the flames of their shared funeral pyre were divided.
  - The separateness of the flames of **Ulysses** and **Diomedes** are compared to their funeral flames. **Inf. XXVI, 52–54**.
- Ethiopia: empire of the Abyssinian people situated on the Horn of Africa under the Solomonic dynasty (1270–1974).
  - the **Eagle** of Justice cites the people of Ethiopia, along with peoples of Persia and India, among examples of those naturally and blamelessly without knowledge of Christ who at the Day of Judgement will, nevertheless, be closer to Christ than many who call themselves Christian, **Par. XIX, 109–111**
- Euclid (c. 365–275 BCE): Greek mathematician, now known as "the father of geometry".
  - Encountered by Dante in **Limbo**. **Inf. IV, 142**.
- Eunoe: River originating in **Terrestrial Paradise** which shares a common source with the River **Lethe**. To drink from the Eunoe is to recall to memory all the good deeds of one's life after losing all memory in the River Lethe.
  - Not found in classical sources, the Eunoe is a creation of Dante. The word means "good knowledge" in Greek. **Purg. XXXIII, 127–145**.
- Euripides: Greek playwright of the 5th century BCE.
  - Resident of **Limbo**. **Purg. XXII, 106**.
- Euryalus: Friend of **Nisus**, he is a Roman mythological who appears in the Aeneid—one of those who "died for Italy". **Inf. I, 106–108**
- Eurypylus: He was a member of the Greek army that conquered Troy. It is told that while the fleet was at Aulis he was sent to the Delphic Sibyl to ask for a favourable wind.
  - Seen among the seers, with **Calchas**, he "set the time to cut the cables". **Inf. XX, 106–113**.
- Ezekiel: Jewish Prophet and author of a book of the Old Testament.
  - The four beasts of his vision (Ezekiel 1:1–28) appear as allegories of the four Gospels in the **Pageant of the Church Triumphant**. **Purg. XXIX, 100–102**.
- Ezzelino da Romano III (1194–1259): Leader of the **Ghibellines** in Northern Italy, known for his cruelties against the citizens of Padua.
  - Pointed out by **Nessus**. **Inf. XII, 109**.

== F ==
- Fabii: Roman family of the Republican Age.
  - Cited as examples of dedication to the public life and to the glory of ancient Rome. **Par. VI, 47**.
- Fabricius: Caius Fabricius, famous Roman hero of the 3rd century BCE. He is remembered for his frugality and his refusal to accept substantial bribes from Pyrrhus.
  - Cited by Hugh Capet, who is repenting on the terrace of the greedy, as an example of life without greed. **Purg. XX, 25–27**.
- Falterona: Mountain in the Apennine Range
  - Mentioned as the source of the Arno River. **Purg. XIV, 16**.

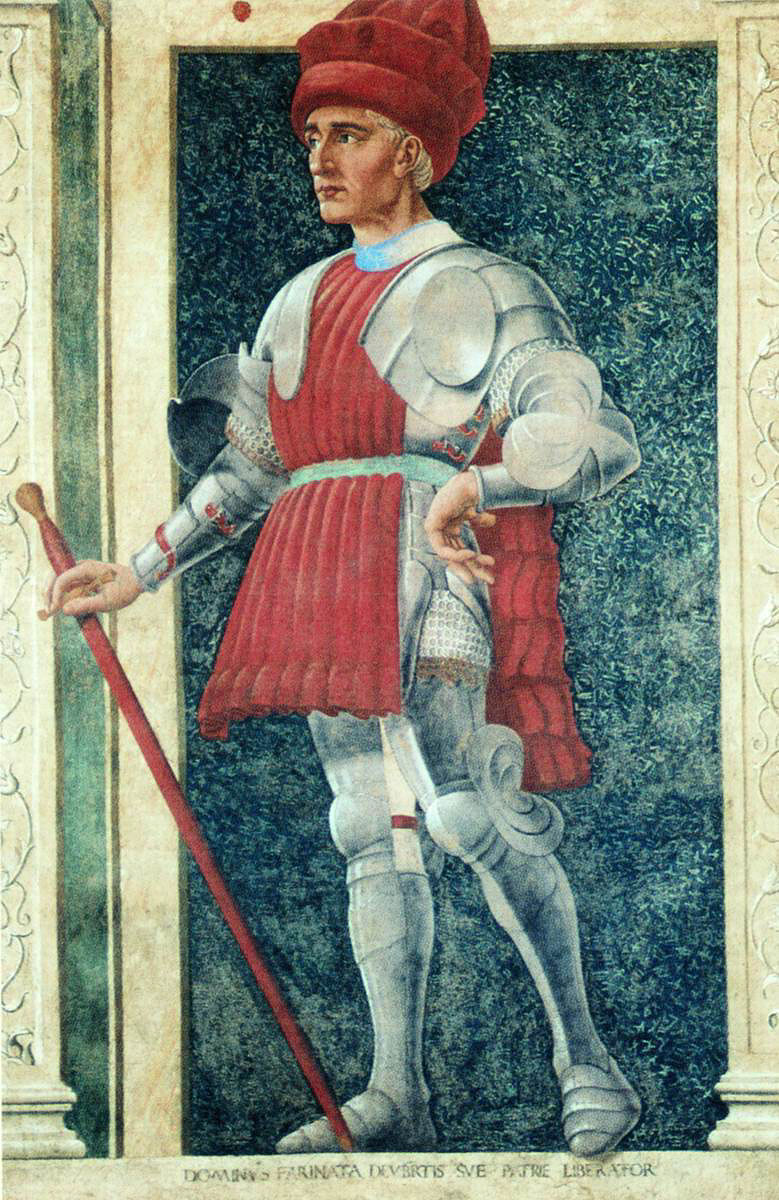
Farinata degli Uberti, as depicted by Andrea del Castagno. Villa Carducci, Florence.

- Farinata degli Uberti (died 1264): Leader of the Florentine **Ghibellines** famous for his defeat of the **Guelphs** (Dante's faction), at the Battle of Montaperti in 1260, causing the Guelphs to be exiled from Florence, though he was able to argue successfully against the destruction of the city. Farinata was posthumously condemned as a heretic during the Franciscan inquisition of 1283. To make peace between the Black and White Guelphs, **Cavalcante de' Cavalcanti**, let his son **Guido Cavalcanti**, the future poet, marry Farinata's daughter.
  - One of a group of famous political Florentines, "who were so worthy ... whose minds bent toward the good", asked about by Dante of **Ciacco**. **Inf. VI, 77–81**.
  - Found among the Epicurean heretics. **Inf. X, 22–51, 73–123**.
  - Predicts Dante's difficulty in returning to Florence after his exile. **Inf. X, 79–81**.
  - Explains that the damned can see the future but not the present. **Inf. X, 97–108**.
- Fiumicello: Tributary of **Phlegethon**. **Inf. XIV, 77**.
- Fleur-de-lis: Flower symbolizing the French crown. **Purg. XX, 86**.
- Florence: Dante's home city. He was exiled from Florence in 1302 and never returned. The Comedy was composed during the period of exile.
  - Condemned with angry sarcasm for its bad government. **Purg. VI, 127–151**.
- Folquet de Marseilles (c. 1165–1231): Troubadour, then Cistercian monk, and later Bishop of Toulouse.
  - Pointed out by **Cunizza da Romano**. **Par. IX, 37–42.**
  - Speaks to Dante and points out Rahab. **Par. IX, 67–142.**
- Rampino Foresi: See **Vanni Fucci**.
- Forlì: City in Romagna. In 1282, under **Guido da Montefeltro**, it withstood a combined siege by French and **Guelph** forces, dealing the French a crushing defeat. After 1300 it was ruled by the **Ordelaffi**.
  - "The city that stood long trial". **Inf. XXVI, 43–45**.
- Fortuna: In Dante's cosmology, a power created by god to "guide the destinies of man on earth" (H. Oelsner, P.H. Wicksteed and T. Okey The Divine Comedy of Dante Alighieri, Vol I, p. 79). **Inf. VII, 61–96**, **XV, 91–96**.
- Fortuna major: figure formed by a combination of the last stars of Aquarius and the first of Pisces. Used by geomancers for divination.
  - Visible before dawn in Purgatory. **Purg. XIX, 4**.
- Fox: Animal often used to symbolize deceit or cunning.
  - In the **Pageant of Church History**, a fox, representing the early Christian heresies, leaps into the Chariot which represents the Church. **Purg. XXXII, 118–123.**
- Francesca da Rimini: See **Paolo and Francesca**.
- Francesco d'Accorso: Eminent jurist of Bologna who taught law at the universities of Bologna and Oxford. Son of the great Florentine jurist Accorsio da Bagnolo, author of the Glossa ordinaria on the Corpus Iuris Civilis.
  - One of a group of sodomites identified by **Brunetto Latini** to Dante. **Inf. XV, 110**.

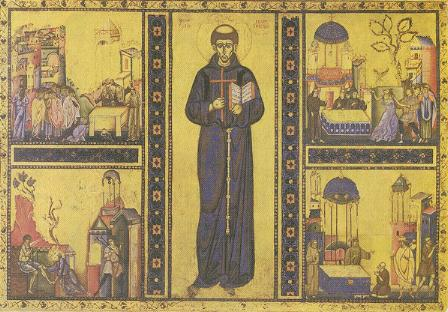
Francis of Assisi, late 13th century

- Saint Francis of Assisi (1182–1226): Son of a wealthy merchant, he spurned his father's riches and founded the Franciscan Order, formally recognized by Pope Honorius III in 1223.
  - Arrives to bring **Guido da Montefeltro** into Heaven, but is forestalled. **Inf. XXVII, 112–114**.
  - Eulogised by **Thomas Aquinas**. **Par. XI, 37–117**.
- Franco Bolognese: 14th-century manuscript illuminator.
  - Mentioned as the student of **Oderisi of Gubbio**.
- Frederick II, Holy Roman Emperor: Was renowned for his **Epicurean** lifestyle, and alleged to have punished traitors by cloaking them in leaden capes and placing them into boiling cauldrons.
  - Among the Epicurean heretics. **Inf. X, 119**.
  - His capes compared to those of the hypocrites. **Inf. XXIII, 66**.
  - His government of Italy viewed favorably. **Purg. XVI, 115–120**.
- Vanni Fucci: Nicknamed Bestia, for his brutality, he was the Illegitimate son of Fuccio de' Lazzari. He took part in the vicious struggles that divided his city **Pistoia**, siding with the **Black Guelphs**, repeatedly sacked the houses of his political enemies. In 1293, he stole the reliquary of San Jacopo from the sacristy of the Cathedral of Pistoia, for which crime the innocent Rampino Foresi was arrested and nearly executed, before the guilt of Fucci and his accomplices was discovered.
  - Among the thieves, like the mythical **phoenix**, he is burned to ashes and restored. **Inf. XXIV, 97–118**.
  - Refers to himself as a "mule" meaning "bastard" ("mul ch'i' fui"). **Inf. XXIV, 125**.
  - Prophesies the triumph in Florence of the Black Guelphs over the Whites. **Inf. XXIV, 143–151**.
  - Swears against God while performing an obscene gesture (a "fig", the insertion of a thumb between the first and second fingers of a closed fist). **Inf. XXV, 1–18**.
- Furies: see **Erinyes**.

== G ==
- Gabriel: One of the Archangels of Christian tradition. He was the angel who announced the conception of **Jesus** to the **Virgin Mary**.
  - Beatrice tells Dante that Gabriel may be depicted in human form, but that this form is an accommodation to the limits of the human imagination. **Par. IV, 47**.
- Galen (131–201): Ancient Greek physician.
  - Encountered by Dante in **Limbo**. **Inf. IV, 143**.
- Ganymede: Young Trojan prince abducted by Zeus in the form of an **eagle** and carried to Olympus to serve as cupbearer in the court of the gods.
  - Dante compares himself to Ganymede when he dreams in his first night in Purgatory that he is carried by an **eagle** into the heavens. **Purg. IX, 22–33**.
- Garisenda: A 160-foot leaning tower in Bologna built in the 12th century.
  - Comparable in size to the giant **Antaeus**. **Inf. XXXI, 136**.
- Geomancer: interpreter of patterns formed by tossed handfuls of soil, rocks, or sand. **Purg. XIX, 3**.
- Geri del Bello: A second cousin of Dante. Apparently he was killed by the Sacchetti family and avenged by the Alegheri in 1310, with the feud continuing until 1342.
  - Of whom Dante says "...a spirit born of my own blood ... his death by violence for which he still is not avenged". **Inf, XXIX, 18–36**.
- Geryon: In Greek mythology, son of Chrysaor and Callirhoe, was a winged giant. The tenth labour of Herakles was to steal his cattle. In medieval times, he was viewed as an example of treacherous deception, which may explain Dante's choice of him as an emblem of fraud.
  - Guardian of the eighth circle, summoned by Virgil, he is encountered in close association with the **usurers**. **Inf. XVI, 106–136**.
  - "La fiera con la coda aguzza, che passa i monti, e rompe i muri e l'armi!...colei che tutto 'l mondo appuzza!" ("The beast who bears the pointed tail, who crosses mountains, shatters weapons, walls!...the one whose stench fills all the worlds!"). **Inf. XVII, 1–27**.
  - Carries Virgil and Dante on his back. **Inf. XVII, 79–136**.
  - Sets down Virgil and Dante in the eighth circle. **Inf. XVIII, 19–20**.
  - Before Dante passes through the fire of Purgatory, Virgil reminds him that he was safe even while riding Geryon. **Purg. XXVII, 23**.
- Gideon: Hero of ancient Israel. According to Judges 7:4–7, he selected the best warriors by the way they drank their water.
  - Cited as examples of temperance and gluttony by a voice hidden in a tree of temptation. **Purg. XXIV, 124–126**.
- Giotto: Florentine painter. (1266/7–1337)
  - Mentioned in Purgatory as the most famous painter of the day. **Purg. XI, 95**.
- Giovanni di Buiamonte dei Becchi: Florentine banker, he had held several important offices which earned him a knighthood.
  - The "sovereign cavalier", whose future damnation as a **usurers** is alluded to by **Reginaldo Scrovegni**. **Inf. XVII, 72–73**.
- Glaucus: Ancient Greek mortal changed into an immortal sea god by eating magical reeds at the sea-shore.
  - Dante claims that he experiences a similar loss of mortality looking on Beatrice. **Par. 1, 64–69**.
- Gloria in excelsis Deo: "Glory to God in the Highest." Opening of a canticle sung in morning prayer services and at the beginning of the Latin Mass.
  - Sung by souls in Purgatory when a soul becomes free to ascend into Paradise. **Purg. XX, 136**.
- Fra Gomita: Chancellor of **Nino Visconti** and Governor of the giudicato of Gallura, in Sardinia—at the time a possession of Pisa. He accepted a bribe to let escape a group of Visconti's enemies who were in his custody. For this he was hanged.
  - Among the **barrators** with **Michele Zanche**, "a dir di Sardigna le lingue lor non si sentono stanche" ("their tongues are never too tired to speak of their Sardinia"). **Inf. XXII, 81–90**.
- Gratian: 12th-century canon lawyer and Camaldolese monk.
  - Pointed out by **Thomas Aquinas** in the sphere of the Sun. **Par. X, 104**.
- Pope Gregory: Gregory I "the Great" (590–604).
  - According to medieval legend, when Pope Gregory prayed for the Emperor Trajan, the emperor was raised from the dead and converted to Christianity. **Purg. X, 75**.
- Griffin: Legendary creature with the body of a lion and the head and wings of an **eagle**.
  - In the allegorical **Pageant of the Church Triumphant**, a griffin representing **Christ** draws a chariot representing the Church. Dante chose a griffin because its two noble natures (lion and **eagle**) correspond to the two natures (divine and human) of Christ. **Purg. XXIX, 106–114**.
- Griffolino of Arezzo: He duped Alberto da Siena saying, that for money, he would teach him to fly. As a result, Griffolino was burned at the stake for heresy by the Bishop of Siena, who favored Alberto, who was perhaps the Bishop's illegitimate son.
  - Among the "falsifiers" of metal (alchemists), sitting with **Capocchio**, propping each other up, as they frantically scratch at the scabs covering their bodies. **Inf. XXIX, 73–99**.
  - He introduces himself. **Inf. XXIX, 109–120**.
  - Referred to as "the Aretine", he identifies **Schicchi** and **Myrrha**. **Inf. XXX, 31–45**.
- Guelphs and Ghibellines: Factions supporting, respectively, the Papacy and the Holy Roman Empire in Italy during the 12th and 13th centuries. After the Guelphs finally defeated the Ghibellines in 1289 at Campaldino and **Caprona**, (Dante apparently fought for the Guelphs at both), they began to fight among themselves. By 1300, Dante's city, Florence, was "divided" between the Black Guelphs, who continued to support the Papacy, and White Guelphs, Dante's party. That year the Whites defeated the Blacks and forced them out of Florence. However, in 1302, the Blacks, with the help of **Pope Boniface VIII**, were victorious and the Whites, including Dante, were banished from Florence. **Inf. VI, 60–72**.
  - Florence the divided city. **Inf. VI, 61**.
  - White Guelphs, party of the woods. **Inf. VI, 65**.
  - Black Guelphs, prevail with help of Boniface. **Inf. VI, 68–69**.
  - Rivalry. **Inf X**.
  - Black and White Guelphs, one after the other, will "hunger" after Dante. **Inf. XV, 71–72**.
  - The expulsion of the White Guelphs from Florence is prophesied: "Fiorenza rinnova gente e modi". **Inf. XXIV, 143–150**.
- Guido del Cassero: See **Malatestino**.
- Guido Guerra of Dovadola (c. 1220–1272): Member of one of the greatest Tuscan families, he was one of the leaders of the **Guelph** faction in Florence, under whose banners he fought the disastrous battle of Montaperti in 1260. Exiled following the triumph of the Ghibellines, he returned to Florence in 1267 when the Guelphs retook control of the city.
  - One of a group of three Florentine **sodomites** who approach Dante, and are much esteemed by him (see **Jacopo Rusticucci**). **Inf. XVI, 1–90.**
  - "In sua vita fece col senno assai e con la spada" ("In his life he did much with the senses and the sword"). **Inf. XVI, 37–39**.
- Guido Guinizelli: Italian poet (c. 1230–1276). Dante considered him the founder of his style of poetry (Dolce Stil Novo).
  - Dante meets him on the terrace of lustful. **Purg. XXVI, 73–135**.
- Guido da Montefeltro (1223–1298): Renowned leader of the **Ghibellines** of Romagna. As ruler of **Forlì**, in 1282, he defeated a French force, which was besieging the city. In 1296 he retired from military life and entered the Franciscan order. **Pope Boniface VIII**, in 1297, asked his advice on how to capture Palestrina, the impregnable stronghold of the Colonna family, offering in advance papal absolution for any sin his advice might entail. He advised Boniface to promise the Colonnas amnesty, then break it. As a result, the Collonas surrendered the fortress and it was razed to the ground. Dante also mentions him in the Convivio, where he curiously extols his piety and sanctity.
  - Among the fraudulent counsellors. **Inf. XXVII, 4–132**.
  - He "made a bloody heap out of the French". **Inf. XXVII, 43–45**.
- Guido da Polenta: The powerful aristocratic ruler of Ravenna and Cervia, the former town taken by him in 1275 and the latter shortly after. He was father of **Francesca da Rimini**, and grandfather of Guido Novello da Ravenna, who was to give Dante hospitality in his last years. The coat of arms of his family contained an **eagle**.
  - "The **Eagle** of Polenta". **Inf. XXVII, 40–42**.
- Robert Guiscard (c. 1015–1085): One of the most remarkable of the Norman adventurers who conquered Southern Italy and Sicily. He was count (1057–1059) and then duke (1059–1085) of **Apulia** and Calabria after his brother Humphrey's death.
  - His warring in Apulia. **Inf. XXVIII, 13–14**.
- Guittone: Italian poet of the generation before Dante. **Purg. XXVI, 55, 124**.
- Guy de Montfort: Son of Simon de Montfort, 6th Earl of Leicester (1208–1265) who was leader of the baronial opposition to king Henry III of England. Simon was killed at the battle of Evesham and Guy revenged his death by killing the king's nephew, another Henry, in a church in Viterbo.
  - Pointed out by **Nessus**. **Inf. XII, 118–120**.

== H ==
- Hadrian V: Pope for 38 days in 1276.
  - Dante encounters him repenting for his greed in the terrace of the greedy. **Purg. XIX, 88–145**.
- Hannibal: Ancient military leader of Carthage, who led an invasion of "Arabs" over the Alps into Italy in the Second Punic War in the late 3rd century BCE.
  - His defeat cited as a triumph of the early Roman Republic. **Par. VI, 49–51**.

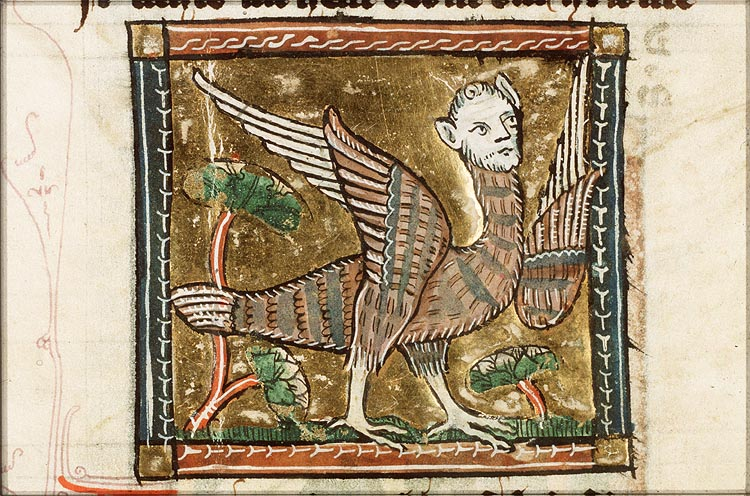
A medieval depiction of a Harpy.

- Harpies: Monsters from Greek mythology with human female faces on the bodies of birds.
  - Tormentors of the suicides in the seventh circle, round 2. Their description is derived from **Virgil** (Aeneid iii, 209 on), which tells how they drove the Trojans from the Strophades. **Inf. XII, 10–15 & 101**.
- Hector: The greatest **Trojan** warrior, in the **Trojan War**.
  - Seen in **Limbo**. **Inf. IV, 121–128**.
- Hecuba: Wife of **Priam** king of **Troy**, mother of **Hector**, **Paris**, **Polyxena** and Polydorus. Captured after the fall of Troy, she went mad after seeing her daughter Polyxena, sacrificed on the tomb of **Achilles** and the corpse of her son Polydorus, murdered by Polymestor, King of Thrace (Euripides, Hecuba, Ovid Metamorphoses XIII, 429–575). According to Ovid she growled and barked like a mad dog.
  - Her "fury" at the deaths of Polyxena and Polydorus. **Inf, XXX, 13–21**.

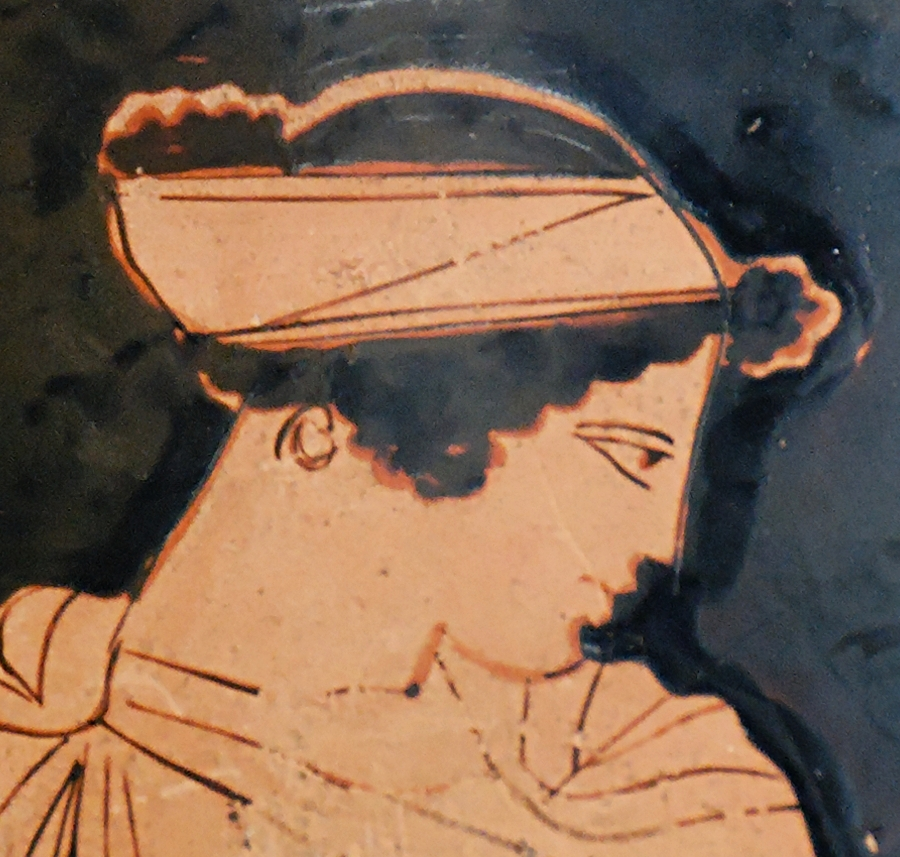
Helen, detail from an Attic red-figure krater, c. 450–440 BCE, Louvre (G 424)

- Helen: Wife of the Spartan king Menelaus and lover of the Trojan **Paris**, her abduction caused the Trojan War.
  - Found amongst the sexual sinners. **Inf. V, 64–65**.
- Helicon: Mountain in Boeotia sacred to the **Muses**. **Purg. XXIX, 40**.
- Heliodorus: Minister to Seleucus IV, Hellenistic ruler of the Seleucid Empire. According to II Maccabees 3:21–28, he was sent to Jerusalem to plunder the treasury of the Temple, but was turned back by supernatural figures, including a man mounted on a horse.
  - Cited by souls on the terrace of the greedy as an example of greed. **Purg. XX, 113**.
- Heliotrope stone: Also called bloodstone, is dark green with spots of red. In the Middle Ages the red spots were thought to be the blood of **Jesus**, and it was believed to have miraculous powers, including making its wearer invisible. Boccaccio writes about it in his Decameron (VIII, 3). **Inf. XXIV, 93**.
- Hellespont: Narrow strait connecting the Black Sea with the Aegean Sea and separating Europe from Asia Minor. In Herodotus' account of the Persian Wars, Xerxes, king of the Persians, spanned the Hellespont with a bridge to invade Greece. When a storm destroyed the bridge, the king ordered his soldiers to flog the waters as punishment.
  - Dante compares the narrow **Lethe** River to the narrow Hellespont. **Purg. XXVIII, 70–72**.
  - The ancient towns of Abydos and Sestos were on the shores of the Hellespont. **Purg. XXVIII, 74**.
- Henry of England (Arrigo d'Inghilterra): Henry III (1216–1272)
  - Dante sees him in the "Valley of the Princes," waiting as a late-repenter to enter Purgatory. **Purg. VII, 130**.
- Heraclitus (c. 535 –c. 475 BCE): Greek Presocratic philosopher.
  - Encountered by Dante in **Limbo**. **Inf. IV, 138**.
- Hera (Juno in Roman mythology): Greek goddess, she is the wife of **Zeus** (Jupiter). A jealous goddess, she often sought revenge against Zeus' many lovers. One of those was Semele, who was the daughter of **Cadmus**, King of Thebes and the mother of Dionysus by Zeus. One of Hera's many acts of revenge against Semele, was to cause Athamas, husband of Semele's sister Ino, to be driven mad. Mistaking Ino, holding their two infant sons Learchus and Melicertes, for a lioness and her cubs, he killed Learchus, and Ino still holding Melicertes jumped off a cliff into the sea. (**Ovid**, Metamorphoses IV, 416–542). Another lover of Zeus, and victim of Hera was Aegina, daughter of the river-god Asopus (see **Aegina** above).
  - Her revenge against "Aegina's people". **Inf. XXIX, 58–65.**
  - Her (Juno's) revenge against Semeles' "Theban family". **Inf. XXX, 1–12**.
- Heracles (Latin: Hercules): Son of **Zeus** and Alcmene, he is probably the most famous Hero of Greek mythology. Of his many achievements, the most famous are the Twelve Labours.
  - His victory over **Cacus**. **Inf. XXV, 29–33**.
  - **Ulysses** recounts his passing the **Pillars of Hercules** at the Strait of Gibraltar, where "Hercules set up his boundary stones that men might heed and never reach beyond". **Inf. XXVI, 108–109**.

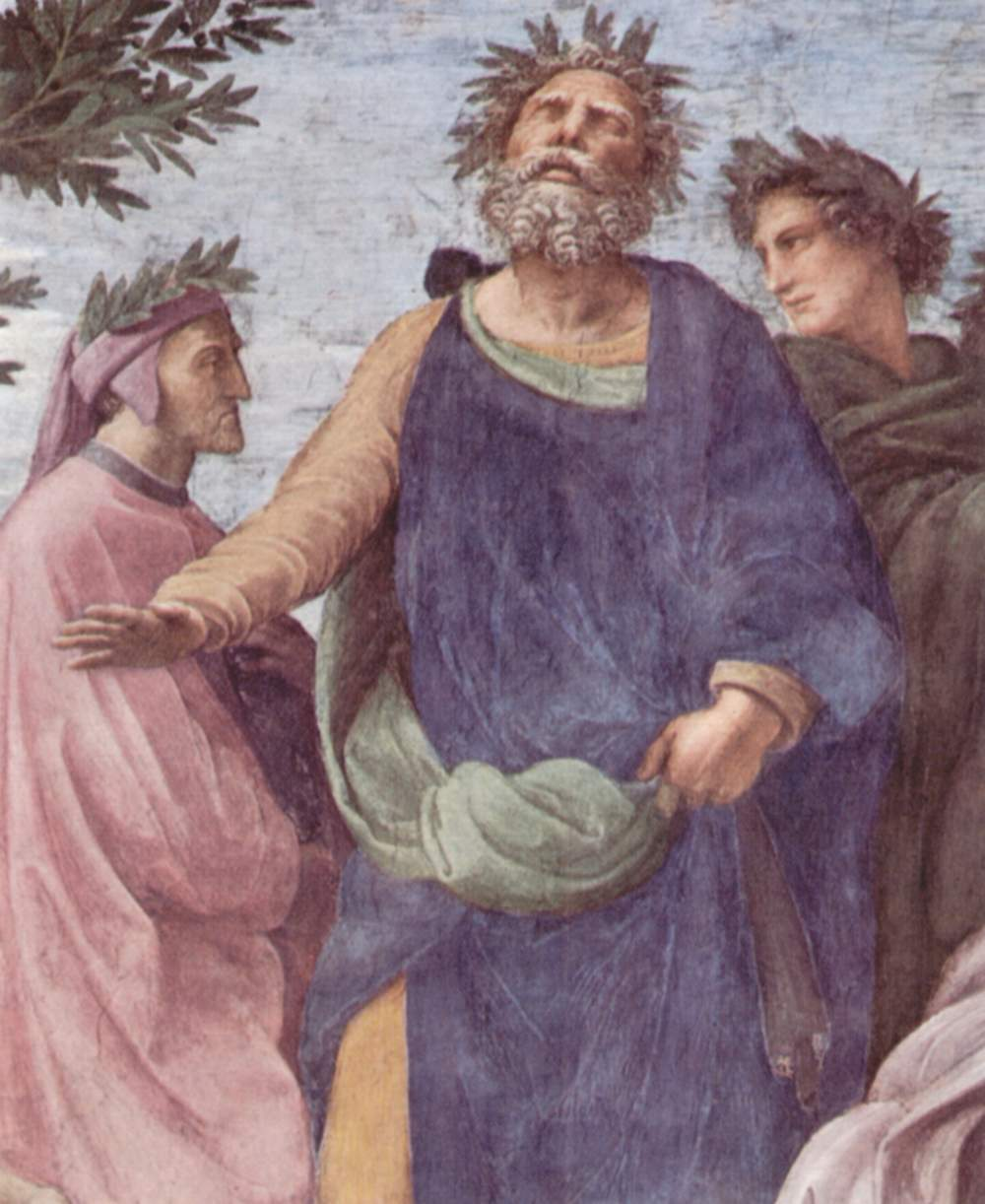
Homer flanked by Dante (left) and Virgil. Detail of fresco, by Raffael, in the Stanza della Segnatura in the Vatican Palace, 1511.

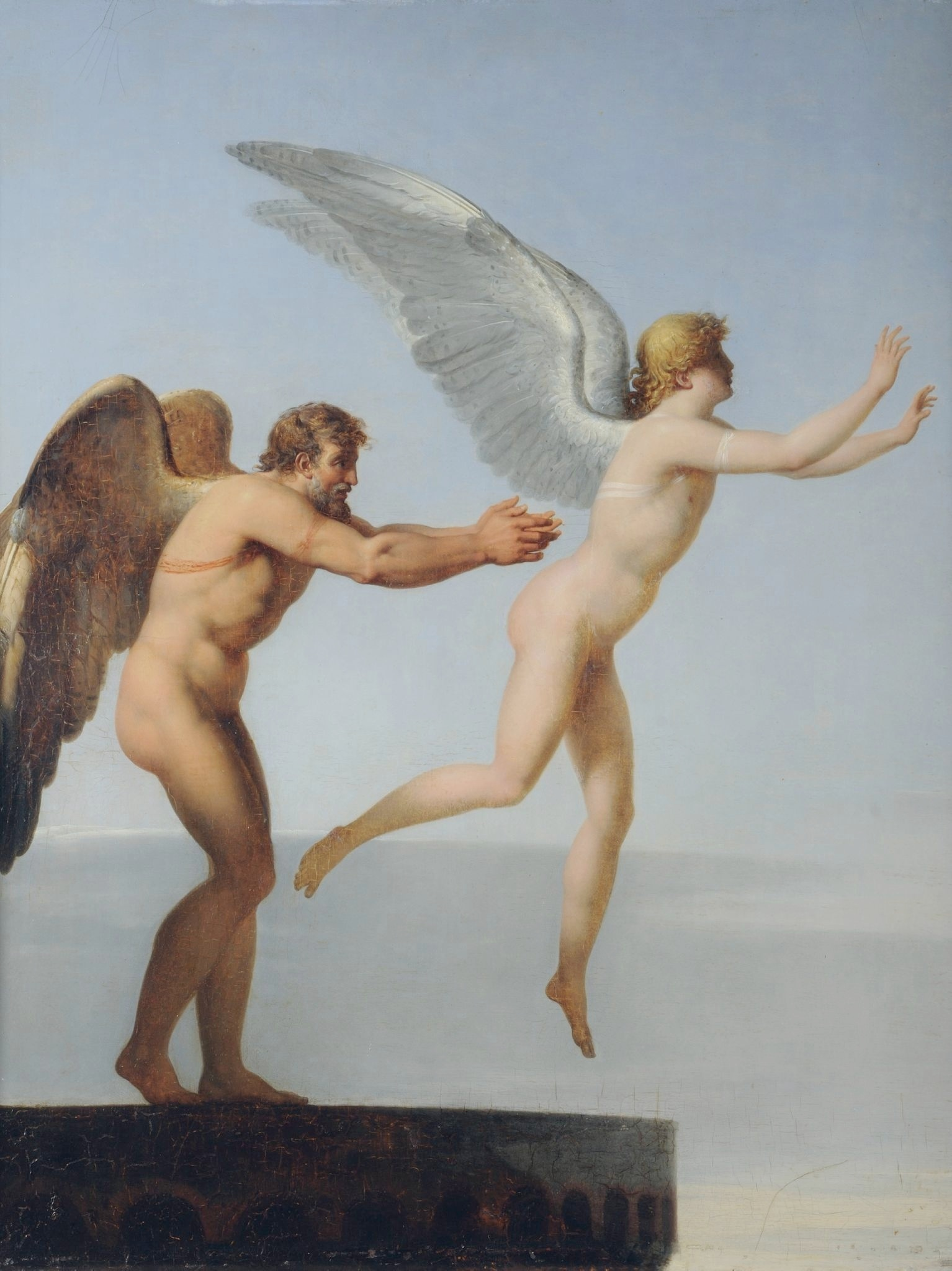
Icarus and Daedalus by Charles Paul Landon

- Hippocrates (c. 460–380 BCE): Ancient Greek physician, often called "the father of medicine.".
  - Encountered by Dante in **Limbo**. **Inf. IV, 143**.
  - Dante identifies St. Luke in the **Pageant of the Church Triumphant** as a disciple of Hippocrates. Ancient tradition holds that Luke was a physician. **Purg. XXIX, 137**.
- Holofernes: According to the Book of Judith, an Assyrian general who invades Israel. He is killed by Judith, who seduces him in his tent.
  - Depicted on the pavement in Purgatory as an example of arrogance. **Purg. XII, 59**.
- Homer: Greek poet credited with the authorship of the epic poems the Iliad, which tells the story of the Trojan War, and the Odyssey, which tells the story of the Greek hero **Odysseus'** adventures returning from that war.
  - Encountered in **Limbo**, leading, "as lord", the three Latin poets **Horace**, **Ovid** and **Lucan**. **Inf. IV, 83–90**.
  - "The lord of song incomparable who like an **eagle** soars above the rest." **Inf. IV, 95–96**.
  - The poets ask Dante "to join their ranks", **Inf. IV, 100–102**.
  - Dante and Virgil leave the company of the poets. **Inf IV, 148**.
- Horace: Latin lyric poet.
  - One of a group of classical poets (see **Homer**) encountered in **Limbo**. **Inf. IV, 89**.
- Hugh Capet: (c. 939–996) First King of the Franks and founder of the Capetian Dynasty.
  - Dante encounters him on the terrace of the greedy, where Hugh laments the greed of his successors to the French throne. **Purg. XX, 34–123**.
- Hypsipyle: Queen of Lemnos, she was seduced and abandoned by **Jason** while en route to the Colchis with the Argonauts.
  - Pitied by **Virgil** for Jason's actions. **Inf. XVIII, 88–95**.
  - Resident of **Limbo**. **Purg. XXII, 112**.

== I ==
- Icarus: In Greek mythology, the son of the inventor **Daedalus**. They escaped from imprisonment in Crete using wings of feathers and wax invented by Daedalus. However, Icarus flew too near the Sun, the wax melted, and he fell to his death.
  - Used as a simile for fear in **Inf. XVII, 109–111**.
- Ilium: See **Troy**.
- "In te, Domine, speravi" ("In Thee, o Lord, have I hoped"): Incipit of Psalm 31 in Latin (Psalm 30 in the Vulgate Bible)
  - First nine verses of the psalm sung by the angels when Dante meets **Beatrice**. **Purg. XXX, 82–84**.
- "In exitu Isräel de Aegypto": ("When Israel came out of Egypt"): Latin incipit of Psalm 114 (Psalm 113 in the Vulgate Bible).
  - Sung by souls arriving in Purgatory. **Purg. II, 46**.
- Indus River: major river of Asia which flows through present day Pakistan and India, with its source in the Tibetan Himalayas.
  - The **eagle** of justice takes the shores of the Indus to represent those regions of the world where news of Christ has never reached and so justice cannot condemn the people for living without baptism, **Par. XIX, 70–76**
- Ino: See **Hera**.
- Alessio Interminelli: Member of a White **Guelph** noble family of **Lucca**. He probably died in 1295.
  - Found among the flatterers. **Inf. XVIII, 115–126**.
- Iphigenia: In Greek legend, daughter of Agamemnon and Clytemnestra. Her father intended to sacrifice her in order to placate the gods who withholding winds to carry the Greek fleet to Troy.
  - Beatrice cites the vow to sacrifice Iphigenia as an example of an injudicious vow that never should have been kept. **Par. IV, 68–72**.
- Iris: Greek personification of rainbows and messenger of the gods.
  - Mentioned in relation to rainbows. **Par. XXXIII, 118**.
- Isaac: The biblical father of the patriarch Israel.
  - Raised by **Jesus** from **Limbo** into Paradise. **Inf. IV, 59**.
- Isidore of Seville: Archbishop of Seville, and one of the great scholars of the early Middle Ages.
  - Encountered in the Fourth Sphere of Heaven (The sun). **Par. X, 130–131**.
- Ismenus and Asopus: Rivers in Boeotia in Greece, where festivals for Dionysus were held. **Purg. XVIII, 91**.
- Israel: One name given to the biblical patriarch Jacob.
  - Raised by **Jesus** from **Limbo** into Paradise. **Inf. IV, 59**.

== J ==
- Jacopo da Santo Andrea: Notorious spendthrift from Padua. He may have been executed by **Ezzelino da Romano** in 1239.
  - One of two spendthrifts (the other called "Lano" is probably **Arcolano of Siena**) whose punishment consists of being hunted by female hounds. **Inf. XIII, 115–129**.

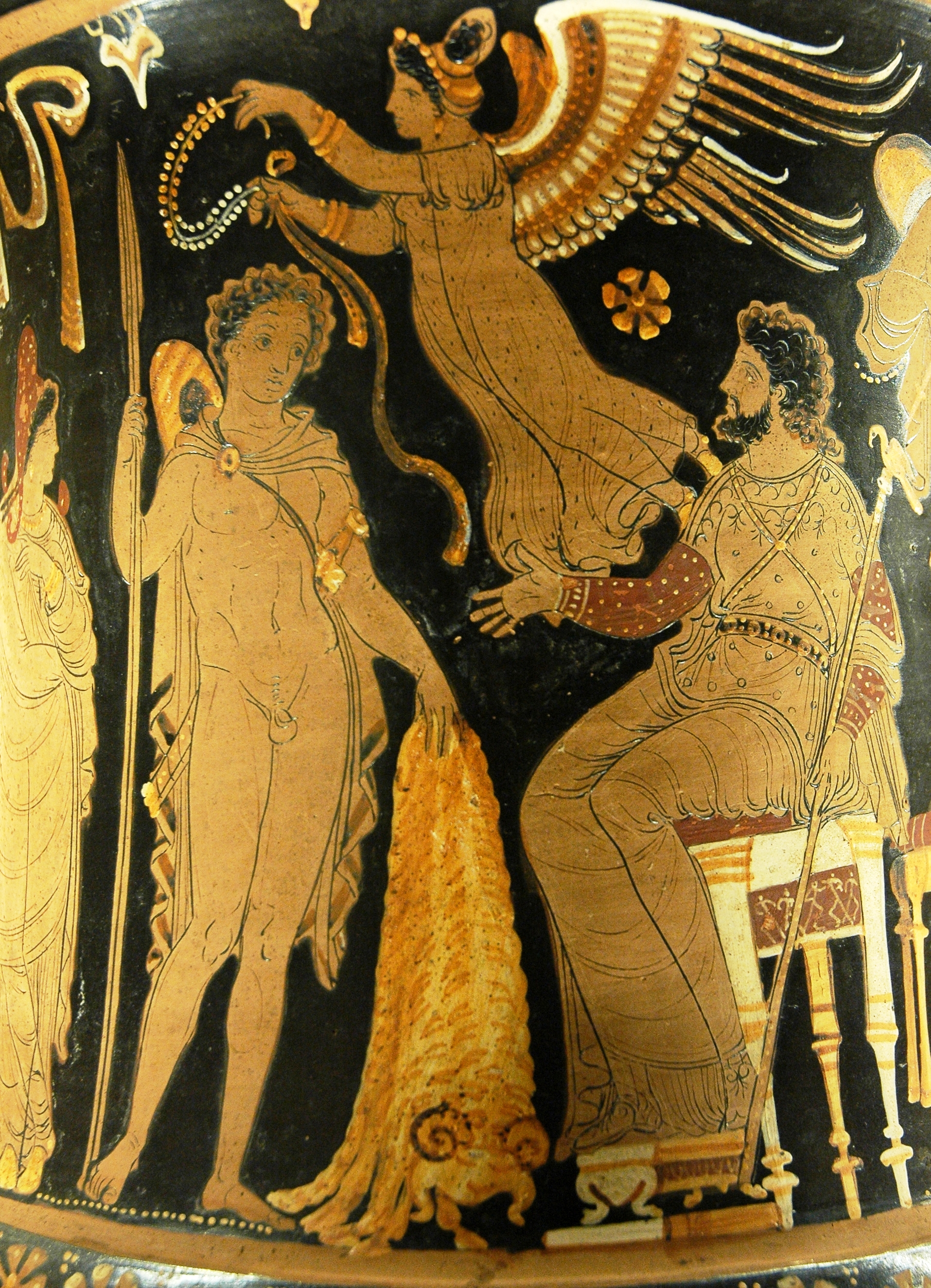
Jason delivering the Golden Fleece to Pelias, the king of Iolcos.

- Jason: Greek mythological hero who led the Argonauts to Colchis in search of the Golden Fleece.
  - Found among the Seducers, for his seduction and abandonment of **Hypsipyle** and **Medea**. **Inf. XVIII, 83–99**.
  - The Argonauts' voyage compared to a voyage into the mysteries of the heavens. **Par. II, 16–18**.
- Jason: Brother of the High Priest of Israel Onias III, he succeeded his brother in c. 175 BCE. According to 2 Maccabees he obtained his office by bribing the Seleucid king **Antiochus IV Epiphanes**.
  - **Pope Clement V** is compared to him. **Inf. XIX, 85–87**.
- Jehoshaphat: Fourth king of the Kingdom of Judah.
  - Mentioned in relation to the end of time. **Inf. X, 11**.
- Jephthah: Judge in ancient Israel who made a careless vow to offer up a sacrifice of thanksgiving for victory in battle and accidentally committed his daughter to that sacrifice. The story appears in Judges 11.
  - Beatrice cites Jephthah as an example of poor judgment. **Par. IV, 64–68**.
- Jerusalem: Location of the Temple of Solomon and site of Jesus' crucifixion. Considered in the Middle Ages as the geographical center of the inhabited world.
  - Hell is located directly below Jerusalem. **Inf. XXXIV, 112**.
  - Purgatory is a mountain at the antipodes of Jerusalem. **Inf. XXXIV, 118–126**, **Purg. IV, 67–71**.
- Jesus: Central figure of Christianity. According to Christian legend, in what is called the Harrowing of Hell, he descended into Hell after his death and rescued certain souls from **Limbo**.
  - **Virgil** describes witnessing his descent into Hell. **Inf. IV, 52–63**.
  - Took spoils from **Dis** in the Harrowing of Hell. **Inf. XII, 38–39**.
  - Unlike the souls being punished for **simony**, Jesus asked no gold from **Saint Peter** in exchange for his office. **Inf. XIX, 90–93**.
  - In his only appearance in the Comedy, he is seen in the form of a **Griffin** in the **Pageant of the Church Triumphant**. **Purg. XXIX, 106–114**.
- Jocasta: Wife and mother of Oedipus, ancient king of Thebes. They had two sons, Polynices and Eteocles. **Statius'** Thebaid tells the story of the family conflict.
  - Mentioned as the subject of Statius' work. **Purg. XXII, 55–57**.
- John the Baptist: The desert prophet, who baptised **Jesus**. He became the patron saint of Florence, displacing the Roman **Mars**, and his image was stamped on the cities gold coin, the florin.
  - In Florence, "the first patron gave way" to him. **Inf. XIII, 143–144**.
  - "The currency which bears" his seal. **Inf. XXX, 74**.
  - A voice in Purgatory on the terrace of the gluttonous cites John as an example in Temperance. **Purg. XXII, 151–154**.
- John the Evangelist: The name used to refer to the author of the Gospel of John. He is also traditionally identified with John the Apostle and the author of the Book of Revelation.
  - Dante interprets a passage of John's Revelation (17:1–3) as a prophecy on the future corruption of the Roman Curia. **Inf. XIX, 106–108**.
  - John's vision (Rev. 4:6–11) of four beasts in the heavenly court draws from a vision of similar beasts by the prophet Ezekiel (Ezekiel 1:1–21). The beasts appear as allegories of the four Gospels in the **Pageant of the Church Triumphant**. **Purg. XXIX, 103–105**.
- Jordan: River on the border of Israel.
  - Crossed by ancient Israelites led by Joshua after an older, less eager generation had died off. Mentioned as a lesson in sloth. **Purg. XVIII, 133–135**.
- Jove: See **Zeus**.
- Jubilee: The first Jubilee of the Roman Catholic church took place in 1300. **Inf. XVIII, 28–33**.
- Judas Iscariot: Disciple who betrayed **Jesus**.
  - **Virgil'**s visit to "Judas' circle". **Inf. IX, 25–27**.
  - "The transgressing soul" replaced by **Saint Matthias**. **Inf. XIX 94–96**.
  - Along with **Brutus** and **Cassius**, one of the three betrayer/suicides who, for those sins, were eternally chewed by one of the three mouths of **Satan**. **Inf. XXXIV, 53–67**
  - The innermost ring of **Cocytus**, where the treacherous to masters and benefactors are punished, is named Judecca. **Inf. XXXIV, 117.**

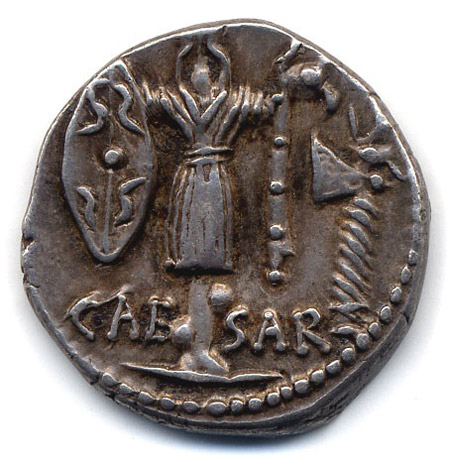
Denarius commemorating Julius Caesar for his success during the Gallic Wars.

- Julia: Daughter of **Julius Caesar** and wife of Pompey.
  - Encountered by Dante in **Limbo**. **Inf. IV, 128**.
- Julius Caesar (100–44 BCE): The celebrated Roman dictator and military commander.
  - **Virgil'**s remembers him (erroneously) as ruler of Rome at his birth. **Inf. I, 70**.
  - Encountered by Dante in **Limbo**, "armato con li occhi grifagni" ("falcon-eyed and fully armed"). **Inf. IV, 123**.
  - Advised by **Curio** to lead his army across the Rubicon, which is considered an act of war against the Roman Republic. **Inf. XXVIII, 97–99**.
  - Souls in the terrace of sloth cite his campaigns in France and Spain as an inspiring example of energy. **Purg. XVIII, 101**.
  - His rumored sexual relations with Bithynian King Nicomedes mentioned on the terrace of the lustful. **Purg. XXVI, 77**. (See Suetonius, The Lives of the Twelve Caesars, Julius Caesar, 49.)
  - His unlawful entry into Rome cited as the beginning of the Roman Empire which ultimately brought an imperial peace to the world. **Par. VI, 55–87.**
- Juno: See **Hera**.
- Justinian: Flavius Petrus Sabbatius Iustinianus, an emperor of Byzantium, known as "the last Roman emperor". A saintly man respected for his law reforms.
  - His "mending [Italy's] bridle". **Purg. VI, 88–93.**
  - Encountered in the Second Sphere: Mercury, as an unnamed "holy form [concealed] within his rays". **Par. V, 115–139.**
  - His discourse on the history of Rome. **Par. VI, 1–111.**
  - His description of the souls in Mercury. **Par. VI, 112–142.**
- Juvenal: Decimus Iunius Iuvenalis, Roman poet of the 1st and 2nd centuries CE.
  - On arrival in **Limbo**, he informed Virgil about **Statius'** poetic accomplishments. **Purg. XXII, 13–15.**

== K ==
- "Kill! Kill!" ("Martira, martira!"): The martyrdom of St. Stephen by an angry mob. He died without anger as he was stoned to death. His last words were a prayer for forgiveness for his enemies. (Acts 7:58–60)
  - Seen in a vision by Dante as he enters the terrace of the angry in Purgatory. **Purg. XV, 106–114**.

== L ==
- "Labïa mëa, Domine": Abbreviation of "Domine, labia mea aperies; et os meum annunciabit laudem tuam." ("O Lord, open thou my lips, and my mouth shall proclaim thy praise.") (Psalm 51:15; Ps 50:15 in the Vulgate.) Verse recited at the beginning of the first monastic prayer office of the day.
  - Chanted in penitence by souls on the terrace of the gluttonous in Purgatory. **Purg. XXIII, 10–12**.
- Lacedaemon: Also known as Sparta, a leading city in ancient Greece.
  - Dante commends Lacedaemon as an example of orderly government. **Purg. VI, 139**.
- Lachesis: One of the three Fates in Greco-Roman mythology. With a measuring rod, she measures out the life-span of every mortal.
  - Mentioned with reference to death. **Purg. XXV, 79**.
- Laertes: Mythical father of **Odysseus** (Ulysses), he was one of the Argonauts. In the Odyssey he takes part in the massacre of **Penelope'**s suitors.
  - Not even Ulysses' love for his father (and wife and son) was enough to overrule his desire "to gain experience of the world and of the vices and the worth of men". **Inf. XXVI, 94–99**.
- Lancelot: Central figure of the Arthurian legend. Reading tales of his amorous adventures led **Paulo and Francesca** astray.
  - **Inf. V, 128**.
- Lano: See **Arcolano of Siena**.
- Brunetto Latini: Famous Florentine Guelph politician and writer, friend and teacher of Dante until his death in 1294.
  - Encountered by Dante among the sodomites in the seventh circle. The meeting between Dante and Brunetto is one of the most important in the Inferno, as Brunetto is given the key role of prophesying the future exile of Dante. Dante extols his encyclopaedia, Li Livres dou Tresor, of which Dante has Brunetto say: "Sieti raccomandato il mio Tesoro, nel qual io vivo ancora". **Inf. XV, 22–124**.
- Lateran Palace: The principle papal residence, from the beginning of the 4th century, until the beginning of Avignon Papacy, in 1305.
  - Used by Dante to allude to Boniface's warring against Christians, rather than "Jews" or "Saracens". **Inf. XXVII, 86**.
  - Dante is struck by the magnificence of heaven like barbarians invading Rome were struck by the city's wonder in the era when "the Lateran / Above all mortal things was eminent." **Par. XXXI, 35-36**.
- Latinus: The "Latian king" and one of a group of figures associated with the history of **Troy**, **Virgil'**s Aeneid, and the history of Rome encountered by Dante in **Limbo**. **Inf. IV, 121–128**.
- Lavinia: Daughter of Latinus and Amata and wife of **Aeneas**.
  - One of a group of figures associated with the history of **Troy**, **Virgil'**s Aeneid, and the history of Rome encountered by Dante in **Limbo**. **Inf. IV, 121–128**; **Par. VI, 3**.
  - Dante has a vision of Lavinia mourning for her mother Amata, who committed suicide after inciting a war between the Latins and the Trojans. The vision comes as Dante departs the terrace of the angry in Purgatory. **Purg. XVI, 34–39**.
- Lawrence: Deacon in the Church in Rome, martyred in 258. According to tradition, he was tied to a grate and burned to death.
  - Beatrice cites Lawrence as an example of a steadfast will. **Par. IV, 83**.
- Leah: Sister to **Rachel**, first wife of Jacob, and mother of six of the tribes of ancient Israel. She was the less attractive of the two sisters, but Jacob was tricked into marrying her first. (Gen 29:16–25)
  - In a dream, Dante sees her gathering flowers. **Purg. XXVII, 97–108**.
- Leander: Ancient Greek youth who carried on a love affair with Hero, a priestess of Aphrodite, who lived on the opposite shore of the **Hellespont**. Each night he would swim across the strait to be with her.
  - Dante compares the **Lethe** River to the Hellespont, and his desire for **Matilda** to that of Leander for Hero.
- Learchus: See **Hera**.
- Lethe: One of the rivers of Hades in Greek mythology. To drink its waters is to forget everything. In the Comedy, its source is in **Terrestrial Paradise** at the top of Purgatory. When it reaches the base of the mountain, it flows down a narrow passageway to the center of the Earth.
  - Its location is asked about and given. **Inf. XIV, 130–138**.
  - Probably the little stream Dante hears at the center of the Earth. **Inf. XXXIV 130–132**.
  - **Guido Guinizelli** tells Dante that even Lethe will not erase his memory of their conversation. **Purg. XXVI, 106–108**.
  - Dante arrives at its banks. **Purg. XXVIII, 25**.
  - **Matilda** explains that its source is miraculous because there is no rain in **Terrestrial Paradise**. **Purg. XXVIII, 121–133**.
  - Dante must repent of his infidelity to **Beatrice** before he is allowed to drink from the Lethe and forget the act. **Purg. XXX, 142–145**.
  - **Matilda** bears Dante through the Lethe. **Purg. XXXI, 94–96**.
  - Dante sees the source of the Lethe in **Terrestrial Paradise**. **Purg. XXXIII, 123**.
- Levi: Son of Jacob and Leah and eponymous forebear of a tribe of ancient Israel. The tribe of Levi was responsible for duties of worship and did not receive a tribal homeland.
  - Dante refers to the clergy as "Levi's sons." **Purg. XVI, 131**.
- Libra: Constellation of the zodiac. During the events of the Comedy, it would be highest in the sky at about 1 A.M.
  - Used to indicate the time of day. **Purg. XXVII, 3**.
- Limbo: The first circle of Dante's Hell and the scene of **Inf. IV**. It is a kind of antechamber in which the souls of the good who died before **Jesus** spend eternity with no punishment other than the lack of the divine presence. In Dante's version, figures from Classical antiquity significantly outnumber those from the Old Testament.
- Linus: Mythical son of Apollo who taught music to **Orpheus**.
  - Encountered by Dante in **Limbo**. **Inf. IV, 141**.
- Livy (c. 59 BCE – 17 CE): The famous Roman historian author of the monumental Ab Urbe Condita, telling the history of Rome from the origins down to his own times.
  - The historian "who does not err". **Inf. XXVIII, 12**.
- Lombards: Germanic tribe who invaded Italy in the 6th century BCE and established a kingdom in the northern part of the peninsula.
  - The conquering Lombards were Arian Christians in belief, where they came into conflict with the Catholic Church in Rome. **Par. VI, 94–95**.
- Peter Lombard (c. 1090–1160): Theologian and Bishop; author of The Sentences, a famous medieval textbook of theology.
  - Pointed out by **Thomas Aquinas** in the sphere of the Sun. **Par. X, 107**.
- Lucan (39–65): Latin poet, whose Pharsalia, an epic poem on the civil war between **Julius Caesar** and Pompey, is an important source for Dante. Like **Seneca** he was forced to commit suicide by Nero for his participation in the Pisonian conspiracy.
  - One of a group of classical poets (see **Homer**) encountered in **Limbo**. **Inf. IV, 90**.
  - The serpents in the **Malebolge** comes from his Pharsalia (IX, 710 ff). **Inf. XXIV, 85–90**.
  - His description in Pharsalia (IX, 761–804) of the deaths and "transformations" of **Sabellus and Nasidiusis** is compared with the transformations of the thieves and sinners in the Malebolge. **Inf. XXV, 94–96**.
- Lucca: A Tuscan city of considerable importance in the Middle Ages; generally **Guelph**, it was traditionally an ally of Florence and an enemy of Pisa.
  - Dante, through the words of a devil, accuses its magistrates of being all corrupt: "torno...a quella terra, che n'è ben fornita: ogn'uom v'è barattier,...del no, per li denar, vi si fa ita" **Inf. XXI, 39–42**.
- Lucia of Syracuse: (Saint Lucy) 4th-century martyr saint associated with light and those, like Dante, who suffered from poor eyesight. She symbolises Illuminating Grace in the poem.
  - Serves as an intermediary between the "gentle lady" (see **Mary**) and **Beatrice**. **Inf. II, 97–108**.
  - Lifts Dante in his sleep to the Gate of St. Peter in Purgatory. **Purg. IX, 55**.
- Lucretia: Legendary woman in the history of the Roman Republic, whose rape by the son of king Tarquinius Superbus was revenged by **Brutus** when he overthrew the king.
  - Encountered by Dante in Limbo. **Inf. IV, 128**.
  - Cited as a reason for the end of Roman monarchy. **Par. VI, 41**.
- Luke: Writer of the third Gospel. Luke includes a story of the resurrected Jesus quietly joining two disciples as they walked the road to Emmaus. (Luke 24:13–27)
  - When **Statius** joins Virgil and Dante as they walked in Purgatory, Dante compares the meeting to the event in Luke. **Purg. XXI, 7–13**.
- Lycurgus: Ancient king of Nemea. According to **Statius's** Thebaid (V.499–730), Lycurgus received **Hypsipyle** and her two sons as refugees from Lemnos and put his own son in her care. When she accidentally permitted the Lycurgus' son to die of a snakebite, the enraged king wanted to kill her. Her two sons rushed to her side to protect her.
  - Mentioned by Dante. **Purg. XXVI, 94–96**.

== M ==
- Paolo Malatesta: See **Paolo and Francesca**.
- Malatesta da Verucchio: Founder of the powerful Malatesta family, he and his son **Malatestino**, were **Guelph** rulers of Rimini from 1295, who killed the chief members of the rival **Ghibelline** family, the Parcitati, including their leader **Montagna de' Parcitati**. Malatesta had two other sons Giovanni, who married **Guido da Polenta'**s daughter Francesca, and Paolo who became her lover (see **Paolo and Francesca**).
  - The old mastiff of Verucchio". **Inf. XXVII, 46–48**.
- Malatestino: Son of **Malatesta da Verrucchio**, after his father's death in 1312, he became Signore of Rimini. He had two nobles of Fano, Guido del Cassero and Angiolello di Carignano, drowned, after he had summoned them to a parley at Cattolica.
  - The new mastiff of Verruchio. **Inf. XXVII, 46–48**.
  - The "foul tyrant" and "traitor who sees only with one eye", his betrayal of Guido and Angiolello. **Inf. XXVIII, 76–90**.
- Malebolge ("evil-pouches"): The eighth circle of Dante's hell, it contains ten trenches wherein the ten types of "ordinary" fraud are punished.
  - Encountered. **Inf. XVIII**.
  - Described as a funnel consisting of concentric and progressively lower ditches. **Inf. XXIV, 34–40**.
  - Its "final cloister" filled with "lay brothers". **Inf. XXIX, 40–42**.
- Malebranche ("evil-claws"): In the Inferno, it is the name of a group of demons in the fifth pouch of the **Malebolge**. They are led by Malacoda ("evil-tail"), who assigns ten of his demons to escort Dante: Alichino, Calcabrina, Cagnazzo ("big dog"), Barbariccia (leads the ten), Libicocco, Draghignazzo, Ciriatto, Graffiacane ("dog-scratcher") Farfarello and Rubicante. Another Malebranche is Scarmiglione.
  - Encountered. **Inf. XXI, 29–XXIII, 56**.
  - A demon is described plunging a **barrator** into a boiling lake of pitch and returning to **Lucca** "for more". **Inf. XXI, 29–46**.
  - Their using prongs to keep the sinner submerged is compared to cooking meat in a pot. **Inf. XXI, 55–57**.
  - Escort assigned. **Inf. XXI 118–123**.
  - Scarmiglione. **Inf. XXI, 100–105**.
  - Barbarariccia's remarkable trumpet. **Inf. XXI, 136–XXII, 12**.
  - The demons escort Dante, guarding the shore as they go. A sinner is dragged ashore, attacked by the demons and is questioned but escapes, and two demons fight and fall into the boiling pitch. **Inf. XXII, 13–151**.
  - Dante and Virgil escape their pursuit. **Inf. XXIII 13–56**.
  - Malacoda's lie is discovered. **Inf. XXIII 140–141**.
- Manfred: King of Sicily from 1258 to 1266.
  - Encountered as an excommunicate in Purgatory, where he waits 30 years for each year of his excommunication. **Purg. III, 112**.
- "Manibus, oh, date lilia plenis." ("O, give lilies by the handful."): Quotation from **Virgil's** Aeneid (VI.883).
  - Sung by angels in the **Pageant of the Church Triumphant**, welcoming **Beatrice** to the procession. **Purg. XXX, 21**.
- Manto: Mythical daughter of **Tiresias**, from her father she inherited the power of prophecy.
  - Seen among the seers in the 8th circle of Hell. **Inf. XX, 52–57**.
  - Virgil tells how Manto travelled until she arrived in the spot that was to be called after her **Mantua**. **Inf. XX, 58–93**.
  - The "daughter of Tiresias" is among those Virgil says also reside with him in the Limbo of Noble Pagans. **Purg. XXII, 113**.
- Mantua: An important and ancient city in Lombardy. Its name is probably of Etruscan origin.
  - Birthplace of **Virgil**. **Inf. I, 69**.
  - **Beatrice** addresses Virgil as "courteous Mantuan spirit". **Inf. II, 58**.
  - **Virgil** tells Dante of the origin of the name of Mantua and about its foundation. **Inf. XX, 58–99**.
  - **Sordello** addresses Virgil as "Mantuan". **Purg. VI, 74**.
- Marcia: Wife of **Cato the younger**.
  - Encountered by Dante in **Limbo**. **Inf. IV, 128**.
  - Permanently separated from her husband, who guards the entrance to Purgatory. **Purg. I, 79**.
- Maremma: Area consisting of part of southern Tuscany (and partly coincident with the province of Grosseto) and some part of northern Latium (a bordering region of the province of Viterbo). in Dante's time it was a desolate marshland, plagued by malaria.
  - Identified as between Cecina and Corneto. **Inf. XIII, 7–9**.
  - Reputation for snakes. **Inf. XXV, 19–20**.
  - Sickness from July until September. **Inf. XXIX, 46–48**.
- Mars: In Roman mythology, the god of war.
  - As ei per questo//sempre con l'arte sua la farà trista (he who with this art always will make it [Florence] sad) he is identified as the patron of Florence before **John the Baptist**. **Inf. XIII, 143–144**.
  - Depicted in a pavement carving in Purgatory casting **Briareus** from Olympus. **Purg. XII, 31**.
- Marsyas: Ancient Greek who challenged Apollo to a contest of musical performance judged by the Muses. After Marsyas lost, Apollo flayed him to death.
  - Dante metaphorically asks Apollo to treat him like Marsyas, by removing his soul from the body in order to write about the heavens. **Par. I, 19–21**.
- Charles Martel of Anjou (1271–1295): son of Charles II of Naples.
  - In the sphere of Venus, he discusses degeneracy among noble families, and denounces confusion of vocations. **Par. VIII, 31–148.**
  - His prophecy. **Par. IX, 1–9.**
- Pope Martin IV: Pope from 1281 to 1285. According to Dante, he died after a gluttonous feast of eels and wine.
  - Dante sees him in the terrace of the gluttons, repenting of his excess. **Purg. XXIV, 22–25**.
- Mary: The mother of **Jesus**.
  - Probably the "gentle lady", who takes pity on Dante and calls on **Lucia** to ask **Beatrice** to help him. **Inf. II, 94–99**.
  - Souls in Purgatory call on Mary to pray for them. **Purg. XIII, 50**.
  - Souls on the terrace of sloth quote her "haste" (Luke 1:39) as a spiritual lesson. **Purg. XVIII, 99–100**.
  - The soul of Hugh Capet on the terrace of greed cites her poverty as a spiritual lesson. **Purg. XX, 19–24**.
  - Called the "only bride the Holy Spirit has known" in reference to the Incarnation. **Purg. XX, 97–98**.
  - Her call for more wine at the marriage at Cana (John 2:3) was for decorum and not because she wanted more wine. Lesson in temperance heard spoken from the tree on the terrace of the gluttonous. **Purg. XXII, 142–144**.
  - Cited as an example in sexual abstinence by souls on the terrace of the lustful. **Purg. XXV, 128**.

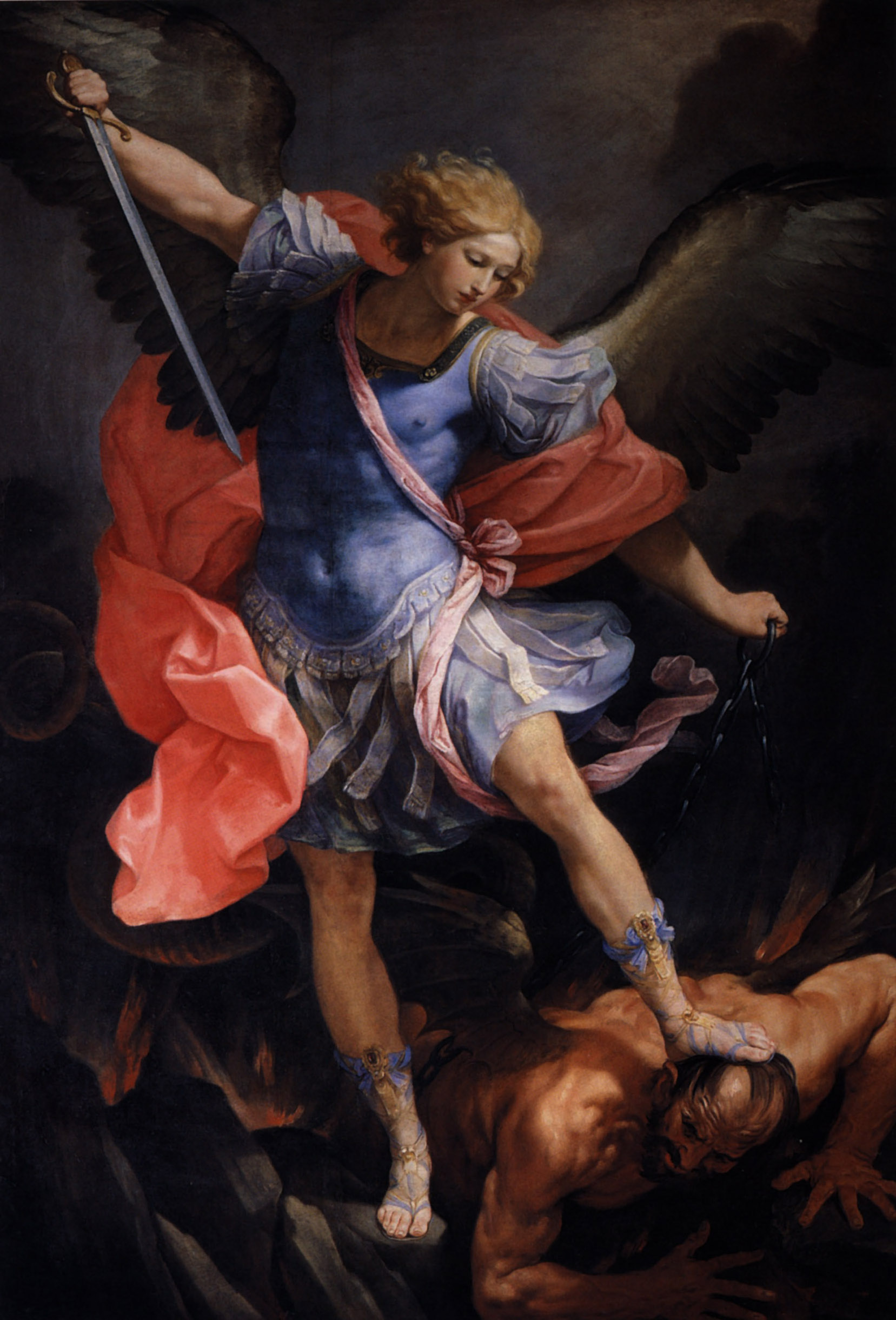
Guido Reni's archangel Michael (in the Capuchin church of Sta. Maria della Concezione, Rome) trampling Satan

- Master Adam: Possibly an Englishman, who came to Bologna by way of Brescia. He was employed by the Guidi, counts of Romena, to counterfeit the Florentine florin. Stamped with the image of **John the Baptist**, the florin contained 24 karats of gold. His contained 21, for which crime he was burned at the stake in 1281.
  - Among the falsifiers, he points out two liars, Potiphar's wife and **Sinon**, with whom he exchanges insults. **Inf. XXX, 49–129**.
- Matilda: Sole permanent resident of the **Terrestrial Paradise**.
  - Dante encounters her gathering flowers on the banks of the River **Lethe**. **Purg. XXVIII, 40**.
- Saint Matthias: After **Judas'** betrayal and suicide, he took his place as one of the Twelve Apostles (Acts of the Apostles I:23–26). Late legends state he was either crucified in Colchis or stoned by the Jews.
  - How he became an apostle is contrasted with the **Simoniacs**. **Inf. XIX, 94–96**.
- Medea: Mythical daughter of Aeetes, king of Colchis, she helped **Jason** get the Golden Fleece, but was abandoned by him. She took revenge by killing their two children.
  - For her also is Jason punished. **Inf. XVIII, 96**.
- Medusa (also known as the Gorgon): In Greek mythology, a female monster whose gaze could turn people to stone. See **Erinyes**.
- Megaera: See **Erinyes**.
- Meleager: Ancient Greek hero who died when his mother completed the burning of a stick. **Purg. XXV, 22**.
- Melicertes: See **Hera**.
- Metellus: Lucius Caecilius Metellus, tribune of the plebs 49 BCE, resisted Julius Caesar when he wanted to plunder the treasury.
  - Mentioned in connection with the **Tarpeian Rock**. **Purg. IX, 138**.
- Michael: Archangel
  - Defeated **Satan**. **Inf. VII 11–12**.
  - Souls in Purgatory call on him to pray for them. **Purg. XIII, 51**.
  - Beatrice tells Dante that Michael may be depicted in human form, but that this form is an accommodation to the limits of the human imagination. **Par. IV, 47**.
- Michal: daughter of King Saul and wife of King **David**.
  - Depicted as an example of arrogance in a wall carving in Purgatory. **Purg. X, 68**.
- Midas: legendary Phrygian king who greedily asked that all he touched be turned to gold.
  - Cited by souls in the terrace of the greedy as an example of the tragedy of greed. **Purg. XX, 103–105**.
- Minerva: Roman goddess of wisdom, equivalent to the Greek goddess **Athena**.
- Minos: A semi-legendary king of Crete, son of **Zeus** and Europa. In The Divine Comedy, he sits at the entrance to the second circle in the Inferno, which is the beginning of Hell proper. Here, he judges the sins of each dead soul and assigns it to its rightful punishment by indicating the circle to which it must descend. He does this by circling his tail around his body the appropriate number of times.
  - Encountered by Dante. **Inf. V, 4–24**.
  - Sends suicides to their appointed punishments. **Inf. XIII, 96**.
  - **Amphiaraus** falls down to him. **Inf. XX, 35–36**.
  - He can also speak, to clarify the soul's location within the circle indicated by the wrapping of his tail. **Inf. XXVII, 124–127**.
  - Who "cannot mistake", condemns **Griffolino of Arezzo** to the tenth pouch. **Inf. XXIX, 118–120**.
  - Virgil not bound by Minos because he resides in Limbo. **Purg. I, 77**.
- Minotaur: In Greek mythology, a creature that was half man and half bull. It was held captive by King **Minos** of Crete, inside the Labyrinth, an elaborate maze designed by **Daedalus**. It was slain by **Theseus**.
  - Guards the seventh circle. **Inf. XII, 11–27**.
- Miserere: ("Have mercy.") Incipit of Psalm 51 (Psalm 50 in the Vulgate Bible.) It is one of the Seven Penitential Psalms.
  - Chanted by souls waiting to enter Purgatory. **Purg. V, 24**.
- "Modicum, et non videbitis me; et iterum, modicum, vos videbitis me." ("In a little while, you will not see me; and in a little while, you will see me again.") Spoken by **Jesus** to his disciples at the Last Supper. John 16:16.
  - Quoted by **Beatrice** before her departure with Dante into Paradise.
- Mongibello: Sicialian name for Mount Etna, thought to be **Vulcan'**s furnace.
  - "The sooty forge". **Inf. XIV, 56**.
- Mosca de' Lamberti: **Ghibelline** who in 1215 rekindled feuding with the **Guelphs** by urging the killing of the Guelph Buondelmonte dei Buondelmonte, for breaking a marriage engagement.
  - One of a group of famous political Florentines, "who were so worthy ... whose minds bent toward the good", asked about by Dante of **Ciacco**. **Inf. VI, 77–81**.
  - Found among the Sowers of Scandal and Schism in the eighth circle, Ninth Pouch. He was a "seed of evil for the Tuscans". **Inf. XXVIII, 106–109**.
- Moses: an important prophet in many Abrahamic religions. He was the leader of the Israelites and the purported author of the Torah.
  - Raised by **Jesus** from **Limbo** into Paradise. **Inf. IV, 57**.
- Mucius: Gaius Mucius Scaevola, ancient Roman soldier from a noteworthy family. When captured by enemies, he held his right hand in a fire to show his steadfast willingness to give his life for Rome.
  - Mentioned by Beatrice as an example of a constant will in the face of adversity. **Par. IV, 84**.
- Muhammad (c. 570–632): The founder of Islam.
  - Found among the "sowers of dissension", he points out his son-in-law **Ali**, and through Dante, warns **Fra Dolcino**. **Inf. XXVIII, 22–63**.
- Muses: In Greek and Roman mythology, the inspiring goddesses of song, poetry and art. It was a standard literary device to invoke their aid when undertaking a difficult writing task.
  - Dante invokes them nine times in the Comedy. **Inf. II, 7–9**, **Purg. I, 7**, **Purg. XXII, 58**, **Purg. XXIX, 37**, **Par. II, 8**.
- Myrrha: In Greek Mythology mother of Adonis, who in disguise committed incest with her father (**Ovid**, Metamorphoses, X, 298–502)
  - Among the falsifiers, "taking another's shape", she "loved her father past the limits of just love". **Inf. XXX, 37–41**.

== N ==
- Nasidius: See **Sabellus and Nasidius**.
- Neptune: God of the sea. **Inf. XXVIII, 83**.
- "Neque nubent": ("Nor do they marry.") (Mat 22:30)
  - Quoted by the penitent soul of Pope Hadrian V in Purgatory to show that worldly honors do not transfer there. Dante had done him reverence on learning his identity. **Purg. XIX, 137**.
- Nessus: See **Centaur**.
- Niccolò: See **Spendthrift Club**.
- Nicholas: Saint and Bishop of Myra in the 4th century. One legend about Nicholas is that he rescued three young poor girls from a life of prostitution by a secret gift of dowries.
  - Cited by Hugh Capet, who is repenting the terrace of the greedy, as an example of generosity. **Purg. XX, 31–33**.
- Pope Nicholas III (c. 1220–1280): Born Giovanni Gaetano Orsini from an eminent Roman family, he was made cardinal by Innocent IV and became pope in 1277, where he distinguished himself for his ability as a politician.
  - Punished among the **Simoniacs** for his nepotism. He prophesies to Dante the arrival in Hell of the popes **Boniface VIII** and **Clement V**. **Inf. XIX, 31–120**.
- Nile: A major river in northeastern Africa.
  - Satan's left face is compared to "those who come from where the Nile, descending, flows". **Inf. XXXIV, 44-45**.
- Nimrod: Great-grandson of Noah. According to Genesis, he was a "mighty hunter" and King of Shinar. Legends about him have him in charge of building the Tower of Babel.
  - Encountered chained in the "Well of the Giants," where he speaks only gibberish. **Inf. XXXI, 58–81**.
  - Depicted on the pavement in Purgatory as an exemplar of arrogance. He is shown at the foot of the Tower of Babel. **Purg. XII, 34**.
  - Mentioned by Adam as he explains the extinction of his own language occurring before Nimrod's aborted construction project. **Par. XXVI, 124**.
- Nino de' Visconti: See **Ugolino della Gherardesca**.
- Ninus: Mythical king of Assyria and eponymous founder of Nineveh, he was the husband of **Semiramis**.
  - Remembered as predecessor of Semiramis on the throne of Assyria. **Inf. V, 59**.
- Niobe: Queen of Thebes, whose seven sons and seven daughters were killed by Apollo and Diana after Niobe boasted she was superior to their mother Latona.
  - Depicted in the pavement carvings in Purgatory as an example of arrogance. **Purg. XII, 37**.
- Nisus: Son of Hyrtacus and friend of **Aeneas** and **Euryalus**. He was mentioned in **Virgil'**s Aeneid. – One of those who "died for Italy". **Inf. I, 106–108**
- Noah: Biblical patriarch. He is best known for building the Ark to save mankind and land animals from extinction during the Flood.
  - Raised by **Jesus** from **Limbo** into Paradise. **Inf. IV, 56**.

== O ==
- Obizzo II d'Este: Marquess of Ferrara in 1264–1293 and a leading **Guelph**. Popular tradition had it that he was killed by his son, **Azzo VIII**.
  - Pointed out by **Nessus**. **Inf. XII, 110–112**.
  - The "marquis" for whom **Venedico Caccianemico** admits to have procured his sister Ghisolabella. **Inf. XVIII, 55–57**.
- Octavian: see **Augustus**.
- Oderisi of Gubbio: 13th-century manuscript illuminator. None of his works survive.
  - Encountered in Purgatory among the prideful. **Purg. XI, 79**.
- Odysseus (Ulysses in Roman mythology): King of Ithaca, he was the son of **Laertes**, husband of **Penelope** and father of **Telemachus**. Known for his guile and resourcefulness, he is the hero of **Homer'**s Odyssey, and a major character in the Iliad. During the **Trojan War**, with **Diomedes**, he stole the **Palladium** and conceived the trickery of the Trojan horse. He was famous for the twenty years it took him to return home from the war.
  - Among the advisors of fraud, he (Ulysses) is punished with Diomedes for the sins they both committed at **Troy**. **Inf. XXVI, 52–63**.
  - At **Virgil'**s urging, he (Ulysses) speaks about his journey after leaving **Circe**. **Inf. XXVI, 79–142**.
  - Mentioned by the siren who tempts Dante in a dream. **Purg. XIX, 22**.
- "Oh, my son, why have you done this to us?": **Mary's** speaks to her young son **Jesus** when he remained in Jerusalem without their knowledge or permission. (Luke 2:48)
  - Seen in a vision by Dante as an example of patience as he enters the terrace of the angry in Purgatory. **Purg. XV, 89**.
- "OMO": Letters seen formed by the eyes and nose-bridge of an emaciated human face. "Homo" in Latin means "human," and in Italian the word is "Uomo."
  - Dante sees the letters in the faces of the fasting souls on the terrace of the gluttonous. **Purg. XXIII, 31–33**.
- Sinibaldo degli Ordelaffi: Head of the noble Ordelaffi family and ruler of **Forlì** and the surrounding territory in Romagna from the end of the 13th century. His coat of arms contained a green lion.
  - Forlì "beneath green paws". **Inf. XXVII 43–45**.
- Orestes: Son of Agamemnon and Clytemnestra. Orestes avenged his father's murder by killing his mother. He refused to let his friend Pylades take the blame for the act.
  - "I am Orestes" is heard by souls in the terrace of the envious as a lesson in generosity. **Purg. XIII, 33**.
- Paulus Orosius (c. 385–420): Historian and theologian; associate of St. Augustine.
  - Not named, but called "that defender of the Christian days who helped Augustine by his history" by **Thomas Aquinas** in the sphere of the Sun. **Par. X, 118–120**.
- Orpheus: Mythical Greek singer and poet who, like Dante, descended into the underworld.
  - Encountered by Dante in **Limbo**. **Inf. IV, 140**.
- Ottokar II, King of Bohemia (1253–1278) and enemy of German King Rudolf I
  - Dante sees them side by side in the "Valley of the Princes." Both are late-repenters, waiting to enter Purgatory. **Purg. VII, 97–100**.
- Ottaviano degli Ubaldini (c. 1210–1250): Cardinal and prominent **Ghibelline** who was the only supporter of their cause at the Papal Court at the time of the Battle of Montaperti (see **Farinata**).
  - Found among the **Epicurean** heretics. **Inf. X, 120**.
- Ovid: Latin poet, whose Metamorphoses, is Dante's principle, mythological source.
  - One of a group of classical poets (see **Homer**) encountered in **Limbo**. **Inf. IV, 90**.
  - His descriptions of the transformations **Cadmus** and **Arethusa** in the Metamorphoses are compared to the transformations of the thieves. **Inf. XXV, 97–99**.

== P ==
- Maghinardo Pagani da Susinana: Signore of Faenza on the river Lamone, and Imola on the river Santerno. **Ghibelline** by birth, he was a **Guelph** in Florence. His coat of arms was a white lion on a blue field.
  - The "young lion of the white lair". **Inf. XXVI, 49–51**.
- Pageant of Church History: Elaborate allegorical representation of the history of the Christian Church which Dante witnesses in Purgatory. **Purg. XXXII & XXXIII**.
  - The allegorical events involve the Chariot from the **Pageant of the Church Triumphant** and represent the troubles of the Church in its first 1300 years.
  - An **eagle** ("the Bird of Jove") attacks the Chariot (the Church), representing the persecutions of Christians by various Roman Emperors. **Purg. XXXII, 109–117**.
  - A malnourished Fox, representing the various early heresies of the Church, leaps onto the Chariot until it is chased away by "my Lady." **Purg. XXXII, 118–123**.
  - The **Eagle** returns and covers the chariot with its feathers, representing the alliance of Church and Roman Empire beginning with the Emperor Constantine I. **Purg. XXXII, 124–129**.
  - A dragon cuts the chariot in half with its tail and drags away half, representing the Islamic conquests during the early centuries of Islam. **Purg. XXXII, 130–135**.
  - The chariot is covered and choked with weeds, representing the institutional corruptions of the church and the confusion of temporal and spiritual authorities. **Purg. XXXII, 136–141**.
  - A harlot appears in the chariot, accompanied by an amorous giant. The harlot, an allusion to Revelation 17, represents the corrupted church, while the giant represents Philip IV of France, who removed the papacy from Rome to Avignon in France in 1307. **Purg. XXXII, 142–160**.
- Pageant of the Church Triumphant: Elaborate allegorical representation of the Church Triumphant which Dante witnesses in Purgatory. **Purg. XXIX & XXX**.
  - The allegorical procession includes:
  - Seven large candelabras emitting rainbow smoke, representing the Seven Gifts of the Holy Spirit. **Purg. XXIX, 43–60**.
  - Twenty-four elders dressed in white, representing the 24 books of the Old Testament. **Purg. XXIX, 82–87**.
  - Four beasts with multiple wings and eyes (Lion, Ox, **Eagle**, & Angel), representing the four Gospels. Ancient tradition associates the four beasts seen in the visions of Ezekiel (Ezekiel 1:4–14) and John (Revelation 4:6–8) to the four Gospels. **Purg. XXIX, 88–105**.
  - A **Griffin** drawing a chariot, representing Christ leading the Church. **Purg. XXIX, 106–114**.
  - A group of three women dancing beside the right wheel, representing the **Three Theological Virtues**. **Purg. XXIX, 121–129**.
  - A group of four women dancing beside the left wheel, representing the Four **Cardinal Virtues**. **Purg. XXIX, 130–132**.
  - Saint Luke, dressed as a physician, and Saint Paul, bearing a sword. **Purg. XXIX, 133–141**.
  - The four authors of the "General Epistles." Finally, the author of the Apocalypse. **Purg. XXIX, 142–144**.
- Palladium: A statue of Pallas Athena. Since it was believed that **Troy** could not be captured while it contained this statue, **Odysseus** (Ulysses) and **Diomedes** stole it during the Trojan War (Aeneid II, 228–240).
  - Its theft is one of the things for which Ulysses and Diomedes are punished. **Inf. XXVI, 63**.

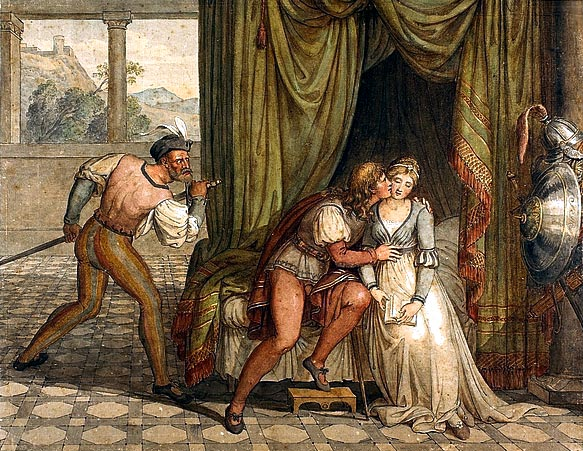
Joseph Anton Koch, Paolo and Francesca discovered by Giovanni, 1805–1810

- Pallas: Legendary ancient Roman youth who bravely fought and died for the liberties of early Rome. His story is recounted in the Aeneid, Book X.
  - Cited by the soul of Emperor Justinian as the first example of the virtuous Roman. **Par. VI, 34–36**.
- Paolo and Francesca: Brother and wife, respectively, of Giovanni Malatesta. The pair were lovers and reputedly killed by Giovanni. Francesca was the daughter of **Guido da Polenta**.
  - Found among the sexual sinners. **Inf. V, 73–138**.
- Montagna de' Parcitati: Of the noble Parcitati family, he was head of the **Ghibelline** faction in Rimini until **Malatesta da Verrucchio** assumed control of the town in 1295. Montagna was first jailed and then treacherously murdered by Malatesta and his son **Malatestino**.
  - His abuse by the "mastiffs of Verruchio". **Inf. XXVII, 47**.
- Paul: One of the apostles of **Jesus**.
  - Recalled by Dante as God's "Chosen Vessel" (Acts 9:15) for an ecstatic journey to the "third Heaven" (2 Corinthians 12:2–4). **Inf. II, 28–32**.
  - Appears bearing the "Sword of the Spirit" (Heb 4:12) in the **Pageant of the Church Triumphant**. **Purg. XXIX, 139–141**.
- Paris: **Trojan**, son of **Priam** and **Hecuba**, brother of **Hector**, and abductor of **Helen**.
  - Found amongst the sexual sinners. **Inf. V, 67**.
- Parnassus: Mountain in Greece near Delphi associated with Apollo and the **Muses**.
  - **Statius** "drank in the cave of Parnassus" as he learned poetry from reading Virgil. **Purg. XXII, 65**.
  - Dante asks Apollo to grant him inspiration from both peaks of Parnassus to undertake writing the Paradiso. **Par. I, 16–18**.
- Pasiphaë: Wife of King **Minos** of Crete and mother of the **Minotaur**. According to Virgil's Eclogue VI, 45–60, she conceived by a bull while hiding inside a hollow wooden cow.
  - Cited penitentially by souls on the terrace of the lustful. **Purg. XXVI, 41**.
- Paternoster: The "Lord's Prayer" taught by **Jesus** to his disciples.
  - Dante is asked to say the prayer when he returns home to assist the passage of souls in Purgatory. **Purg. XXVI, 130–132**.
- Penelope: Faithful wife of **Odysseus** (Ulysses) king of Ithaca, refusing the many suitors who invaded her home, she waited twenty years for him to return home from the **Trojan War**.
  - Not even Ulysses' love for his wife (and son and father) was enough to overrule his desire "to gain experience of the world and of the vices and the worth of men". **Inf. XXVI, 94–99**.
- Penthesilea: Queen of the Amazons, she fought on for **Troy** during the **Trojan War**.
  - Seen in **Limbo**. **Inf. IV, 124**.
- Perillus: See **Sicilian bull**.
- Pelorus: northeast promontory of Sicily.
  - Mentioned as severed from the Apennine Range. **Purg. XIV, 32**.
- Persius: Aulus Persius Flaccus. Roman writer of the 1st century BCE
  - Resident of **Limbo**. **Purg. XXII, 100**.

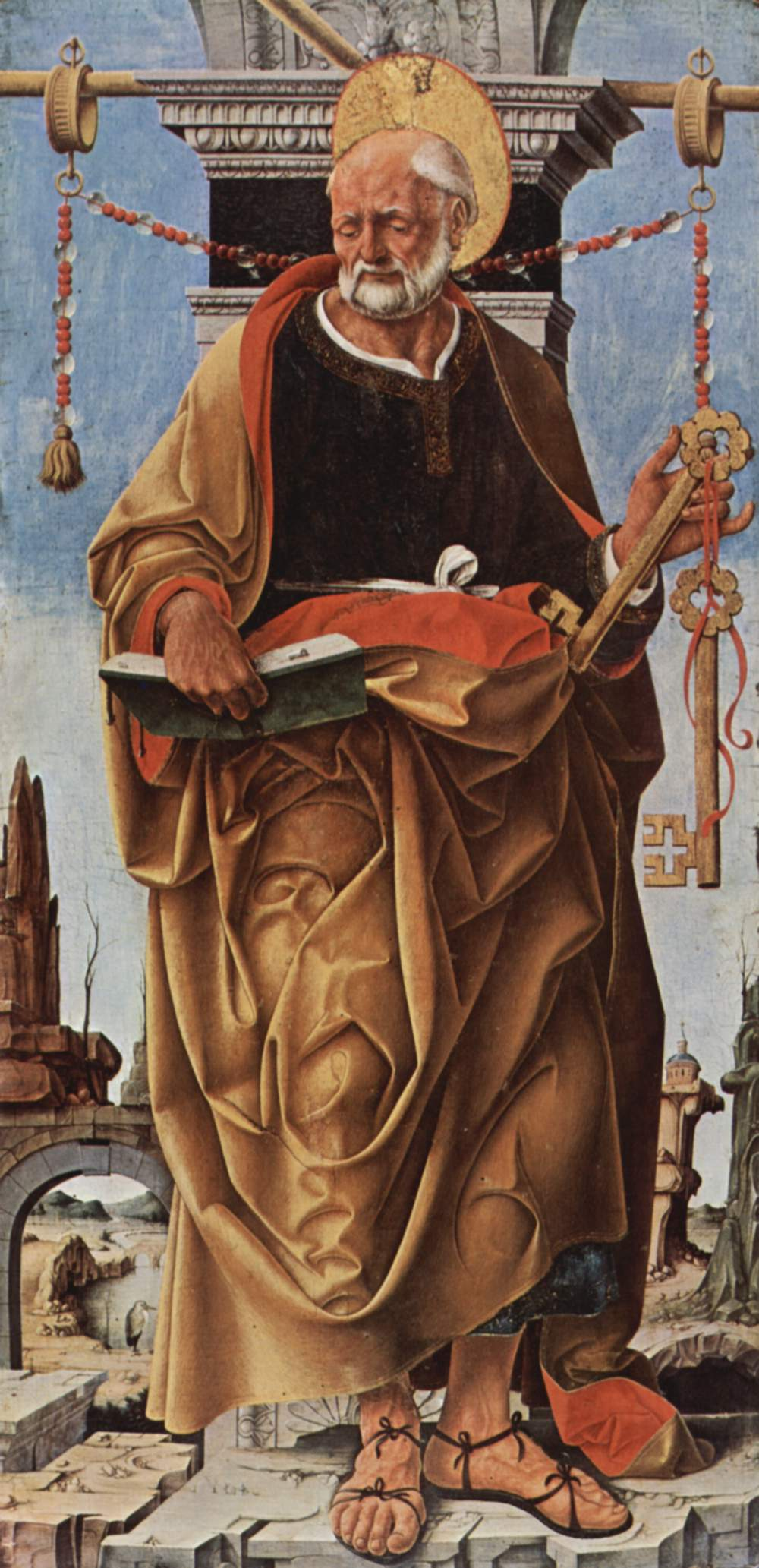
St. Peter, oil on panel by Francesco del Cossa (1473), Pinacoteca di Brera, Milan

- Saint Peter: One of the apostles of **Jesus**, and first pope.
  - "la porta di San Pietro" ("the gateway of Saint Peter"). **Inf. I, 133**.
  - In contrast to the **Simoniacs**, he paid no gold, to become head of the church, nor did he ask for any from **Saint Matthias** to make him an apostle. **Inf. XIX, 90–96**.
  - Souls in Purgatory call on Peter to pray for them. **Purg. XIII, 51**.
  - **Par XXIV**, Dante's "Examination of Faith" by St. Peter; his presence first described by Beatrice: "And she: 'O eternal light of the great man/ To whom Our Lord entrusted the same keys/ Of wondrous gladness that he brought below'." (trans. by Cotter, ln. 34–36).
- St. Peter's Pine Cone: A colossal bronze pine cone cast in the 1st or 2nd century CE in Rome. Originally located in the Campus Martius, it is now located in a courtyard in the Vatican Museum.
  - Dante compares it to the dimensions of Nimrod's head. **Inf. XXXI, 59.**
- Phaëton: In Greek mythology, the son of Helios, the sun god. To prove his paternity, he asked his father to allow him to drive the chariot of the sun for one day. Unable to control the horses, Phaëton almost destroyed the earth, but was killed by **Zeus**.
  - Used as a simile for fear in **Inf. XVII, 106–108**.
  - Used as a reference to the sun. **Purg. IV, 73**, **Par. XXXI, 125**.
- Philomela: A mythological princess from Athens who was raped by her sister's (Procne's) husband Tereus. Tereus cut out her tongue afterwards but Philomela was able to tell her sister what happened by weaving a tapestry. Procne got revenge by killing their son Itys and serving him as a meal to Tereus. The sisters prayed to the gods to be saved from his wrath and were transformed into a swallow and a nightingale.
  - The transformation of Philomela into a swallow is referenced in **Purg. IX 14-15**.
  - The cannibalism of Itys and Procne's transformation into a nightingale is referenced in **Purg. XVII 19-21**.
- Philip IV of France (1268–1314): King from 1285, his reign is memorable for many reasons. In particular he is famous for having shattered the temporal ambitions of the popes.
  - Probably an allusion to the accusation that **Clement V** had got his pontificate by promising to pay **Philip**. **Inf. XIX, 87**.
- Phlegethon: "River of fire", in Greek mythology, one of the rivers of Hades.
  - Boiling river of blood. **Inf. XII, 47–48**.
  - Encountered and described. **Inf. XIV, 76–90**.
  - Formed from the tears of the statue of the Old Man of Crete. **Inf. XIV, 94–116**.
  - Identified as the "red stream boiling". **Inf. XIV, 130–135**.
  - Its deafening roar compared to the waterfall near the monastery of San Benedetto dell'Alpe. **Inf. XVI, 91–110**
- Phlegra: In Greek mythology, the site of **Zeus'**s defeat of the Giants (Gigantes) at the end of the Gigantomachy. **Inf. XIV, 58**.
- Phlegyas: In Greek mythology he was the ferryman for the souls that cross the **Styx**. **Inf. VIII, 10–24**.
- Phoenix: Mythical bird, which at the end of its life-cycle, burns itself to ashes, from which a reborn phoenix arises.
  - Its description here is derived from **Ovid'**s Metamorphoses (XV, 392–407). **Inf. XXIV, 107–111**.
- Pholus: A wise **Centaur** and friend of Herakles. **Inf. XII 72**.
- Photinus, a deacon of Thessalonica. See **Anastasius**.
- Pia de' Tolomei: A Sienese woman allegedly murdered by her husband, Paganello de' Pannocchieschi, who had her thrown from a window in **Maremma**.
  - She asks for Dante's prayers when he encounters her waiting to enter Purgatory among souls who died suddenly and unprepared. "Son Pia, Siena mi fé, disfecemi Maremma." ("I am Pia. Siena made me; Maremma unmade me.") **Purg. V, 130–136**.
- Piccarda: Sister of Dante's friend **Forese Donati** who failed to carry out her lifelong monastic vow.
  - In the sphere of the moon, she explains to Dante the varieties of blessedness among those in Paradise. **Par. III, 34–120.**
- Pier da Medicina: Apparently a political intriguer in Romagna, of whom little is known. Early commentators say he sowed discord between the **Malatesta** and **Polenta** families.
  - Foretells the betrayal and doom of **Guido and Angiolello**, and points out **Curio**. **Inf. XXVIII, 63–99**.
- Pier della Vigna (c. 1190–1249) Minister of **Frederick II, Holy Roman Emperor**. He fell from favour in 1249 and subsequently committed suicide.
  - Punished amongst the suicides in **Inf. XIII, 28–108**.
- Pier Pettinaio: (1180–1289) Sienese comb-seller remembered for his piety and honesty. Siena established a festival in his memory.
  - Sapia, a woman among the envious in Purgatory, says that his prayers have assisted her. **Purg. XIII, 128**.
- Pierides: Daughters of Pierus, king of ancient Macedon, who entered into a contest with the Muses.
  - Mentioned in Purgatory. **Purg. I, 11**.
- Pilate: Roman governor of Judea, responsible for the crucifixion of **Jesus**.
  - Philip IV of France compared to Pilate in his humiliation of Pope Boniface VIII. **Purg. XX, 91**.
- Pillars of Hercules: Name given to the promontories—the Rock of Gibraltar in Europe and Monte Hacho near Ceuta in Africa—that flank the entrance to the Strait of Gibraltar. According to legend, **Heracles** (Hercules), on his way to steal the cattle of **Geryon** split a mountain in half, thereby forming the Strait of Gibraltar and connecting the Atlantic Ocean to the Mediterranean. The pillars marked the western boundary of the classical world, beyond which it was unsafe to sail.
  - **Ulysses** describes sailing past these "boundary stones" to the see the world which "lies beyond the sun". **Inf. XXVI 106–116**.
- Pinamonte dei Bonacolsi: An able and shrewd politician he took advantage of the fights between **Guelphs and Ghibellins** that were dividing **Mantua** to establish himself in 1273 as supreme ruler of the city, founding a Signoria that was kept by his family until 1328.
  - His deviousness in ousting **Alberto da Casalodi**. **Inf. XX, 95–96**.
- Pisistratus: Athenian tyrant of the 6th century BCE. His wife angrily demanded the life of a young man seen publicly embracing their daughter. Pisistratus refused to succumb to anger and gives a mild reply.
  - Seen by Dante in a vision as he enters the terrace of the angry in Purgatory. **Purg. XV, 94–105**.
- Pistoia: A Tuscan town which in Dante's time had lost much of its autonomy, becoming a sort of Florentine dependency.
  - **Vanni Fucci** prophesies the exile of the **Black Guelphs** from the town. **Inf. XXIV, 143**.
  - Invective against the town. **Inf. XXV, 10–12**.
- Plato: Greek philosopher and teacher of **Aristotle**. In Dante's day, his writings were less influential than those of his student.
  - Encountered by Dante in **Limbo**. **Inf. IV, 134**.
  - Mentioned by Virgil as one "who would—if reason could—have been content". **Purg. III, 43**.
  - Beatrice corrects Dante's mistaken ideas about the eternal destiny of souls which he gathered from Plato's Timaeus. **Par. IV, 29–63**.
- Plautus: Roman poet of the 2nd century BCE.
  - Resident of **Limbo**. **Purg. XXII, 98**.
- Plutus: In Greek mythology, he was the personification of wealth. Dante almost certainly conflated him with Pluto, the Roman god of the Underworld. He is found in the fourth circle of Dante's hell, in which the greedy and prodigal are punished. **Inf. VII, 1–15**.
- Pola: Italian seaport (now part of Croatia) famed for its Roman necropolis.
  - Simile for the tombs in the sixth circle. **Inf. IX, 112**.
- Polycletus: Ancient Greek sculptor, famous for his realism.
  - Wall carvings in Purgatory compared to his work. **Purg. X, 32**.
- Polydorus: See **Hecuba**.
- Polymestor: Ancient king of Thrace. He killed Polydorus, young son of the **Trojan** King **Priam**, to steal the treasure that the boy possessed.
  - Cited by souls on the terrace of the greedy as an example of greed. **Purg. XX, 115**.
- Polynices: See **Eteocles**
- Polyxena: **Trojan** daughter of **Priam** and **Hecuba**. In some accounts, **Achilles** fell in love with her, and was killed while visiting her. At the demand of Achilles' ghost, Polyxena is sacrificed on Achilles' tomb.
  - With whom "Achilles finally met love—in his last battle". **Inf. V, 65**.
  - Her death helps drive Hecuba mad with fury. **Inf. XXX, 16–18**.
- Pompey: Pompey "the Great" (106–48 BCE). Famous patrician Roman general.
  - Cited as a virtuous Roman in the days of the Roman Republic. **Par. VI, 52.**
- Priam: King of **Troy**, husband of Hecuba, father of **Hector** and **Paris**.
  - King when Troy was brought down. **Inf. XXX, 15**.
  - Asked **Sinion** to tell the truth about the Trojan horse. **Inf. XXX, 114**.
- Priscian: Eminent Latin grammarian active in the 6th century who wrote the Institutiones grammaticae, extremely popular in the Middle Ages.
  - One of a group of sodomites identified by **Brunetto Latini** to Dante. **Inf. XV, 109**.
- Procne: See **Philomela**.
- Proserpina: Roman goddess whose story is the myth of springtime. She was the daughter of Ceres and wife of Pluto, king of the underworld. In Greek mythology her name is Persephone.
  - "Queen of never-ending lamentation". **Inf. IX, 44**.
  - Moon goddess whose face is "kindled" once a month. **Inf. X, 79**.
  - When Dante sees **Matilda** gathering flowers in the **Terrestrial Paradise**, he is reminded that Proserpina was doing the same when he was abducted by Pluto. **Purg. XXVIII, 49–51**.
- Ptolemy: Greek geographer, astronomer, and astrologer. His geocentric theory of the universe was the standard astronomical model of Dante's day.
  - Encountered by Dante in **Limbo**. **Inf. IV, 142**.
- Ptolemy son of Abubus: Official in the early Hasmonean kingdom which then controlled Judea.
  - The third ring of **Cocytus**, where the treacherous to guests are punished, is named Ptolomea. **Inf. XXXIII, 124**.
- Puccio Sciancato: Of the noble **Ghibelline** Florentine Galigai family, he was exiled in 1268 after the Guelphs' triumph, but accepted the peace brokered in 1280 by Cardinal Latino to reconcile the factions. He was nicknamed Sciancato ("lame").
  - Among the thieves. **Inf. XXV, 148–150**.
- Pygmalion: Ancient King of Tyre. He murdered his uncle and brother-in-law to obtain their wealth.
  - Remembered as an example of greed by souls in the terrace of the greedy. **Purg. XX, 103–105**.
- Pyrrhus: Either **Achilles'**s son Neoptolemus, killer of **Priam** and many other **Trojans**, or Pyrrhus of Epirus, could be intended, although the latter was praised by Dante in his Monarchy (II, ix, 8).
  - Pointed out by **Nessus**. **Inf. XII, 135**.
  - Pyrrhus of Epirus cited as an early enemy of Rome. **Par. VI, 44**.

== Q ==
- "Qui lugent": ("Who mourn") An abbreviation of "Beati qui lugent quoniam ipsi consolabuntur." ("Blessed are they who mourn, for they shall be comforted") (Mat 5:4; 5:5 in the Vulgate)
  - Spoken by an angel as Dante passes out of the terrace of the slothful. **Purg. XIX, 50**.
- Quintius: Lucius Quinctius Cincinnatus (520–430 BCE). Ancient Roman noble who assumed dictatorial powers in a crisis and then promptly relinquished them to return to his farm. The city of Cincinnati, Ohio, is named in his honor.
  - Cited as an exemplar of ancient Roman virtue. **Par. VI, 46–47**.

== R ==
- Rachel: Sister to **Leah**, second wife of Jacob, and mother of two of the tribes of ancient Israel, including Joseph and Benjamin. She was the more attractive of the two sisters, but Jacob was tricked into marrying Leah first. (Gen 29:16–25) She symbolises the contemplative life in the Comedy.
  - Companion of **Beatrice** in Heaven. **Inf. II, 102**.
  - Raised by **Jesus** from **Limbo** into Paradise. **Inf. IV, 60**.
  - In a dream, Dante hears Leah mention her beautiful sister. **Purg. XXVII, 103–108**.
- Rahab: A gentile woman who lived in Jericho in the Promised Land. She assisted the Israelites in capturing the city by hiding two men who had been sent to scout the city prior to their attack.
  - Encountered by Dante in the third circle of heaven. **Par. IX, 116**.
- Rehoboam: King of ancient Israel. He was the son of **Solomon** and succeeded him on the throne. Because of his oppressive taxation, the northern tribes revolted and formed an independent kingdom.
  - Depicted on the pavement in Purgatory as example of arrogance. **Purg. XII, 46**.
- "Rejoice, you who have overcome." ("Godi tu che vinci!"): A paraphrase combining "Rejoice and be exceeding glad," (Mat 5:12) with "To him that overcometh will I give to eat of the tree of life" (Rev 2:7).
  - Heard by Dante in Purgatory as he departs the terrace of the envious. **Purg. XV, 39**.
- Rhea: See **Cronus**.
- Rinier da Corneto and Rinier Pazzo: Highwaymen who lived in Dante's day. Pazzo was excommunicated by Pope Clement IV, in 1268
  - Pointed out by **Nessus**. **Inf. XII, 137**.
- Richard of St. Victor: One of the most important 12th-century mystic theologicans. A Scot, he was prior of the famous Augustinian abbey of Saint-Victor in Paris from 1162 until his death in 1173. His writings on mystical contemplation won him the title "Magnus Contemplator", the great contemplator.
  - "He whose meditation made him more than man". **Par. X, 130**.
- Ripheus: A Trojan hero known for his righteousness that was not rewarded by the gods.
- Romée de Villeneuve: Prime minister and chamberlain of Ramon Berenguer V, Count of Provence known for managing the affairs of Raybond very well. **Par. VI, 128**
- Rubaconte: Former name of the bridge now known as Ponte alle Grazie in Florence. Located at the foot of a hill.
  - Compared to the path of ascent in Purgatory. **Purg. XII, 102**.
- Rudolf I, King of the Romans (1273–1291).
  - Dante sees him in the "Valley of the Princes," waiting to enter Purgatory. Rudolph is described as "he who neglected that which he ought to have done", perhaps a reference to his failure to come to Italy to be crowned Emperor by the Pope. **Purg. VII, 91–96**.
- Ruggiere degli Ubaldini: See **Ugolino della Gherardesca**.
- Jacopo Rusticucci: Florentine **Guelph** of **Guido Cavalcanti'**s guild, active in politics and diplomacy.
  - One of a group of famous political Florentines, "who were so worthy ... whose minds bent toward the good", asked about by Dante of **Ciacco**. **Inf. VI, 77–81**.
  - One of a group of three Florentine **sodomites** who approach Dante, and are much esteemed by him. **Inf. XVI, 1–90**.
  - Blames his wife for his sin: '"e certo fu la fiera moglie più ch'altro mi nuoce". **Inf. XVI, 43–45**.
  - Questions Dante about **Borsiere'**s reports of the moral decay of Florence, which have caused great anguish for him and his companions. **Inf. XVI, 66–72**.
  - Represents (with the other two sodomites) past civic virtue, providing an opportunity for Dante to rail against "La gente nuova e i sùbiti guadagni" ("newcomers and quick gains"), as the cause of Florentine decadence. **Inf. XVI, 73–75**.

== S ==
- Sabellus and Nasidius: Two soldiers of **Cato'**s army in **Lucan'**s poem Pharsalia (IX, 761–804), who are bitten by snakes, while marching in the Libyan Desert, after which their bodies "transform". Sabellus' transforms into a rotting formless mass; Nasidius' swells, then bursts.
  - Their cruel fate is compared to that of the thieves. **Inf. XXV, 94–95**.
- Sabine Women: Young women abducted by Roman youths in the early days of Rome. **Par. VI, 41**.
- Saladin: 12th-century Kurdish Muslim leader renowned for his military prowess, generosity, and merciful attitude to his opponents during the Crusades.
  - Encountered by Dante in **Limbo**. **Inf. IV, 129**.
- Salve Regina: Hymn to the **Virgin Mary** used in evening services. The song addresses Mary from "the vale of tears."
  - Sung at sunset by souls in waiting to enter Purgatory in the "Valley of the Princes." **Purg. VII, 83**.
- Samaria: Region north of Jerusalem and west of the Jordan River. According to John 4:4–28, Jesus encountered a Samaritan woman at a well. Their dialogue is about spiritual thirst.
  - Dante's eagerness to learn the meaning of the earthquake in Purgatory is compared to spiritual thirst. **Purg. XXI, 1–4**.
- Sardinia: Italian Island north of Tunisia and south of Corsica. In Dante's time it was plagued by malaria.
  - Sickness from July until September. **Inf. XXIX, 46–48**.
- Sannella: (Simonetti della Sannella) Italian noble family, latter known as Simonetti, one of the ancient Florentine families from the time of Cacciaguida.
  - Mentioned together with other noble families, such as: Arca, Soldanier, Ardinghi, and Bostichi **Par. XVI**.

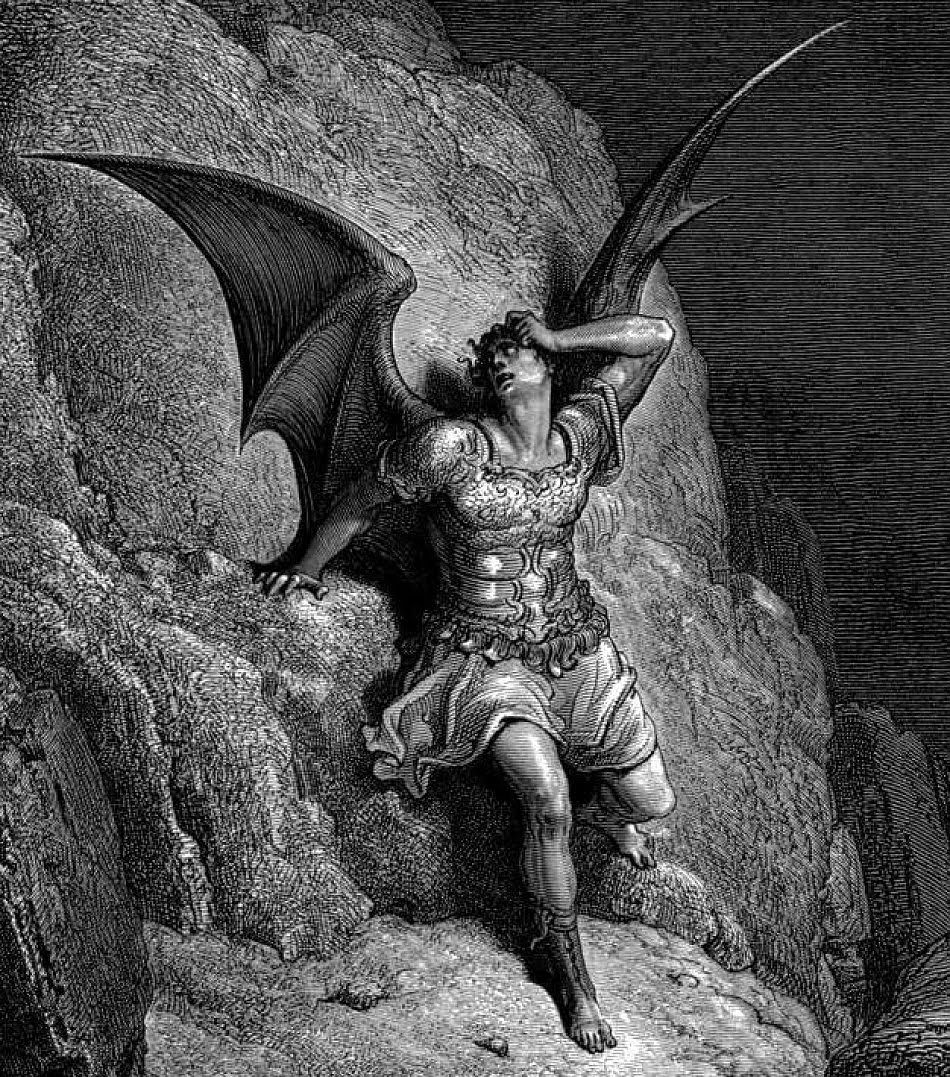
Gustave Doré's depiction of Satan from John Milton's Paradise Lost.

- Sapia Salvani: 13th-century Sienese noblewoman.
  - Encountered on the terrace of the envious. **Purg. XIII, 109**.
- Sapphira: early Christian woman who died along with her husband after confessing to withholding money promised to the Church (Acts 5:1–11).
  - Cited as an example of greed by souls on the terrace of the greedy. **Purg. XX, 112**.
- Satan: Biblical angel who embodies evil and is the greatest foe of God and mankind.
  - Encountered frozen in **Cocytus** at the center of the earth. **Inf. XXXIV, 28–67**
  - Depicted in a pavement carving falling from heaven as an exemplar of arrogance. **Purg. XII, 25**.
- Saturn: Seventh and outermost planet in the geocentric planetary theory in Dante's day.
  - Known as the "cold planet," it and the moon draw heat away from the earth at night. **Purg. XIX, 1–2**.
- Saul: First king of ancient Israel. He died by falling on his own sword after losing a battle at Gilboa.
  - Depicted on the pavement in Purgatory as an exemplar of arrogance. **Purg. XII, 40**.
- Gianni Schicchi: Disguised as the Florentine **Buoso Donati**, who had just died, he dictated a new will, bequeathing to himself Donati's best mare.
  - With his tusks he drags off **Capocchio**, after which **Griffolino of Arezzo** tells of Schicchi's impersonation. **Inf. XXX, 22–45**.
- Scipio: Roman general (236–183 BCE) who defeated Hannibal at the Battle of Zama.
  - The giant **Antaeus** lived in the valley where the battle of Zama was fought. **Inf. XXXI, 115**.
  - Cited as a hero of the Roman Republic. **Par. VI, 52.**
- Scorpius: Constellation in the form of a Scorpion and sign of the Zodiac.
  - Dante sees stars at dawn "in the form of an animal that assails with its tail." **Purg. IX, 5**.
  - Scorpius is on the meridian line when Dante enters the terrace of the lustful. Hence is it 2 P.M. in Purgatory. **Purg. XXV, 3**.
- Michael Scot (c. 1175–1234): Scottish mathematician, philosopher, alchemist and astrologer, honoured by popes and emperors, especially **Frederick II**, he developed a popular reputation as a magician and seer.
  - Damned among the soothsayers. Of him it is said "che veramente de le magiche frode seppe 'l gioco" ("of a verity of magical illusions knew the game.") **Inf. XX, 115–117**.
- Scotland: see **Anglo-Scottish War**
- Second Punic War: The second of the wars fought between Carthage and Rome (219–202). According to **Livy**, Hannibal sent to Carthage "a pile" of gold rings from the fingers of thousands of slaughtered Romans.
  - "The long war where massive mounds of rings were battle spoils". **Inf. XXVIII, 10–12**.
- Semele: See **Hera**.
- Semiramis: Legendary figure who was, in Dante's day, believed to have been sexually licentious after the death of her husband Ninus.
  - Found amongst the sexual sinners. **Inf. V, 52–60**.
- Seneca, Lucius Annaeus (c. 4 BCE – 65 CE): Roman philosopher, statesman and dramatist, forced to commit suicide by Nero for his participation in the Pisonian conspiracy, called "morale" (moral), by Dante.
  - Encountered by Dante in **Limbo**. **Inf. IV, 141**.
- Sennacherib: King of Assyria (705–681 BCE). His failed siege of Jerusalem is discussed in II Kings, which notes the army's destruction by a plague sent by God and his later assassination by his sons.
  - Depicted on the pavement in Purgatory as an example of arrogance. **Purg. XII, 53**.
- Serchio: A river near Lucca.
  - Leisurely floating on ones back in this river is contrasted, by the Malebranche, with the different kind of swimming by the barrators in the lake of boiling pitch. **Inf. XXI, 49**.
- Seven Deadly Sins: A list developed by Christian moralists of the principal vices. They include Pride (superbia), Greed (avaritia), Lust (luxuria), Envy (invidia), Gluttony (gula), Anger (ira), and Sloth (acedia).
  - Dante's Purgatory is structured in seven levels where souls are purged of these vices before entering Paradise. Virgil explains them in order of ascent.
  - Pride is "hope of excellence through the abasement of another." **Purg. XVII, 115–117**.
  - Envy is "love of misfortune" of another when the other excels. **Purg. XVII, 118–120**.
  - Anger is "seeking another's harm" after being injured by another. **Purg. XVII, 121–123**.
  - Sloth is love for the Good which is "slack." **Purg. XVII, 130–132**.
  - Greed, Gluttony & Lust are "excessive self-abandonment" (troppo s'abbandona) to the lesser goods of possessions, food & drink, and sexual desire. **Purg. XVII, 136–139**.
- Sextus Pompeius: Son of Pompey the Great and opponent of **Julius Caesar**, portrayed by **Lucan** as a cruel pirate (Pharsalia VI, 420–422).
  - Pointed out by **Nessus**. **Inf. XII, 135**.
- Shepherd: reference to the Pope as chief shepherd of the Christian flock.
  - Criticized for failure to distinguish spiritual and secular powers. He can "chew the cud" (has wisdom) but does not "have cleft hooves" (have both spiritual and temporal authorities). See Lev 11:3. **Purg. XVI, 98–99**. He also has "joined the sword to the shepherd's crook." **Purg. XVI, 109–110**.
- Sibyls: Oracles in Ancient Greece. **Par. XXXIII, 66**.
- Sichaeus: First husband of Dido and ruler of Tyre, he was murdered by Dido's brother.
  - It is remembered that Dido "ruppe fede al cener di Sicheo" ("broke faith with the ashes of Sichaeus"). **Inf. V, 62**.
- Sicilian bull: A brazen figure of a bull used as an instrument of torture. The echoing screams of its victims, roasting inside, were thought to imitate the bellowing of a bull. It was created by Perillus for the tyrant Phalaris. Its creator was also its first victim.
  - It "would always bellow with its victims voice". **Inf. XXVII, 7–12**.
- Silvester I: A saint, he was Pope from 314 to 335. In the Middle Ages, supported by a forged document called the "Donation of Constantine", it was believed that he had baptized **Constantine** and cured him of leprosy, and as a result, that he and his successors had been granted rule over Rome and the Western Roman Empire. For Dante, this event was the beginning of the ever-increasing worldly wealth and power of the papacy, and the corruption that went along with it.
  - "The first rich father!" **Inf. XIX, 117**.
  - **Guido da Montefeltro** compares Silvester being sought by Constantine to cure his leprosy, with himself being sought by **Boniface** to "ease the fever of his arrogance". **Inf. XXVII, 94–95**.
- Simon Magus: The magician (or proto-Gnostic) of Samaria. In the Acts of the Apostles (8:9–24) he is rejected by the apostle **Peter** for trying to buy the ability to confer the Holy Spirit. From his name is derived the word **Simony**.
  - His followers "fornicate for gold and silver". **Inf. XIX, 1–4**.
- Simonides: Greek poet of the 5th century BCE.
  - Resident of **Limbo**. **Purg. XXII, 107**.
- Simony: Sin of selling or paying for offices or positions in the church hierarchy (cf. **barratry**).
  - One of the sins of ordinary fraud punished in the eighth circle. **Inf. XI, 59**.
  - Dante arrives in the 3rd Bolgia of the eighth circle where the Simoniacs are set upside-down in rock pits, with their exposed feet in flames. **Inf. XIX, 1–117**.
- Sinon: In Virgil's Aeneid, he was a Greek warrior during the Trojan War, who, having pretended to change sides, convinced the Trojans to bring the Trojan Horse into Troy, thus allowing the Greek soldiers hidden within it to climb out after dark, open the gates to the city, and let in the Greek army, who then captured the city.
  - Among the falsifiers, he is one of two liars pointed out by **Master Adam**. **inf. XXX 98**.
- Siren: Seductive chimera, half-woman and half-bird, who lures sailors to shipwreck on rocks with her singing.
  - Appears to Dante in a dream. **Purg. XIX, 7–33**.
  - **Beatrice** tell Dante that other women are sirens on his spiritual journey. **Purg. XXXI, 44**.
- "Sitiunt": ("They thirst.") Abbreviation of "Beati qui esuriunt et sitiunt iustitiam quoniam ipsi saturabuntur." ("Blessed are those who hunger and thirst after righteousness, for they shall be satisfied.") One of the Beatitudes preached by **Jesus** in Matthew 5.
  - Heard by Dante as he departed the terrace of the greedy in Purgatory. **Purg. XXII, 6**.
- Socrates: Greek philosopher.
  - Encountered by Dante in **Limbo**. **Inf. IV, 134**.
- Reginaldo Scrovegni: One of the richest Paduan bankers. In expiation of his father's sin, his son Enrico commissioned the Cappella degli Scrovegni in 1300 that was frescoed by Giotto.
  - Among the **usurers**. **Inf. XVII, 64–75**.
- Sodom: Biblical city, which during the Middle Ages, became associated in Christian thinking with the sin of homosexuality. Sodomy, like **usury**, was viewed as a sin against nature.
  - Used to locate the sodomites as being punished in the last ring of the seventh circle. **Inf. XI, 50**.
  - "Sodom and Gomorrah" is recited penitentially by one group on the terrace of the lustful. **Purg. XXVI, 40**.
- Solomon: Biblical king; son of King David; proverbially the wisest of men.
  - Not named, but called "the high mind blessed to know to such great depths, no second ever rose who saw so much" by **Thomas Aquinas** in the sphere of the Sun. **Par. X, 109–114**.
- Spendthrift Club (Brigata Spendereccia): A group of rich young Sienese nobles, devoted to squandering their fortunes on foolish extravagances and entertainments. **Arcolano of Siena** was a member.
  - Four of its members described by Capocchio: "Stricca", "Niccolò", "Caccia d'Asciano" and "Abbagliato". **Inf. XXIX, 125–132**.
- Sordello: 13th-century Italian troubadour, born in Goito near Virgil's home town **Mantua**.
  - In Purgatory he personifies patriotic pride. **Purg. VI, 74**.
- Statius: Publius Papinius Statius (c. 45 – c. 96). Roman poet of the Silver Age and author of the Silvae, the Achilleid and the Thebais.
  - Dante and Virgil encounter him in the level of Purgatory reserved for the avaricious, and he accompanies them on the rest of their trip through Purgatory. **Purg. XXI–XXXIII**.
  - In a story created by Dante, Statius tells how reading Virgil converted him to Christianity. There is no historical evidence that Statius was a Christian. **Purg. XXII, 64–91**.
- Stricca: See **Spendthrift Club**.
- Strophades: See **Harpies**.
- Styx: One of the rivers encircling Hades in the Aeneid (VI, 187, 425).
  - Encountered and described. **Inf. VII, 100–129**.
  - Formed from the tears of the statue of the Old Man of Crete. **Inf. XIV, 94–116**.
- "Summae Deus clementiae": ("God of highest mercy.") Latin monastic hymn sung on Saturday mornings. Its third verse calls on God to consume our loins with a fire of divine love.
  - Sung by souls on the terrace of the lustful in Purgatory. **Purg. XXV, 121**.
  - Dante mentions the bird's song as a harbinger of dawn in Purgatory. **Purg. IX, 14**.
- Sylvius: See **Aeneas**.
- Syrinx: Mythological Greek nymph who, escaping her sexual defilement, fled to a river and was converted into a hollow reed which sang as the wind blew.
  - Alluded by Dante as the musical reason for his sleep in Paradise. **Purg. XXXII, 66**.

== T ==
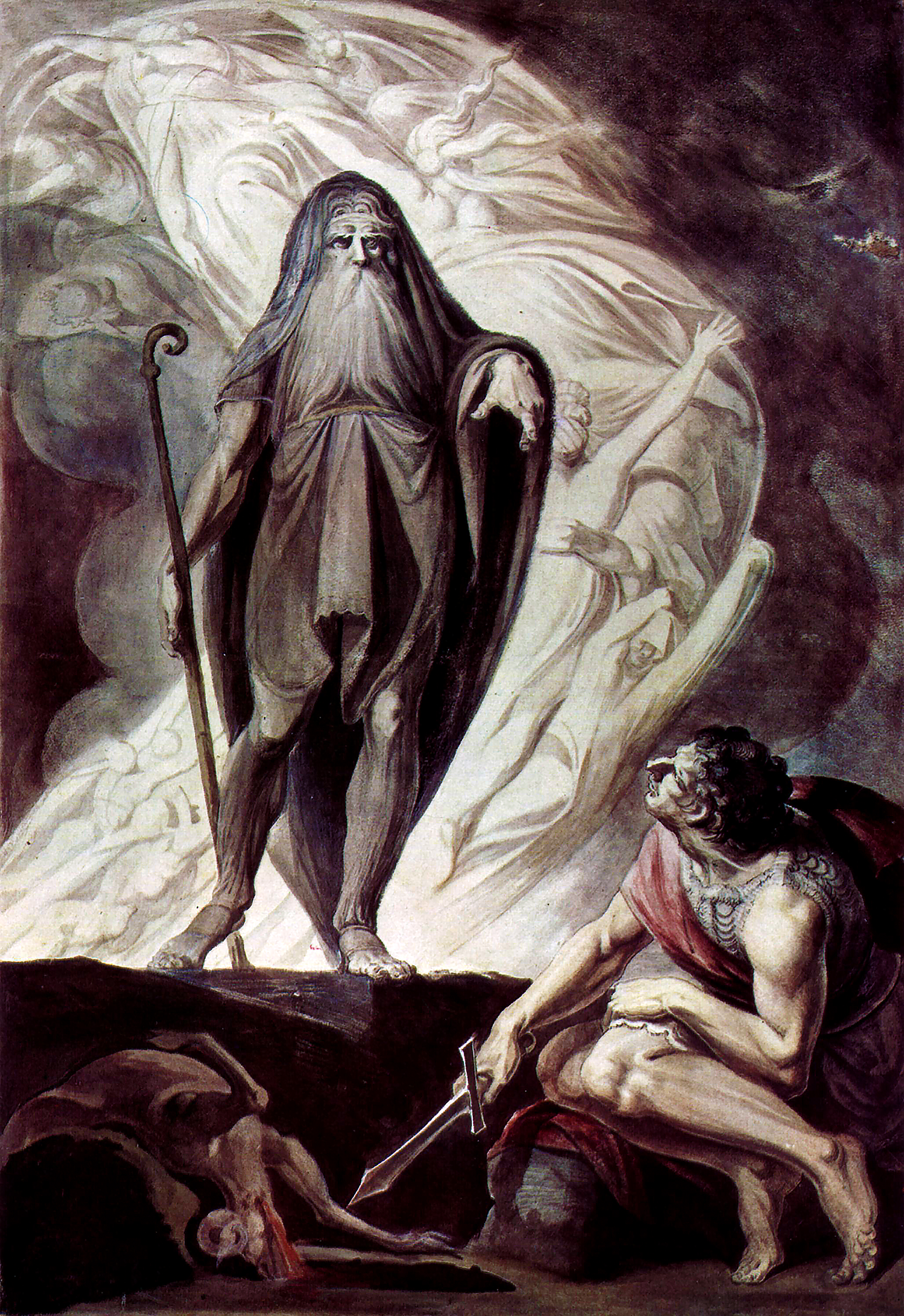
Tiresias appears to Odysseus during the nekyia of Odyssey xi, in this watercolor with tempera by the Anglo-Swiss Johann Heinrich Füssli, c. 1780–85

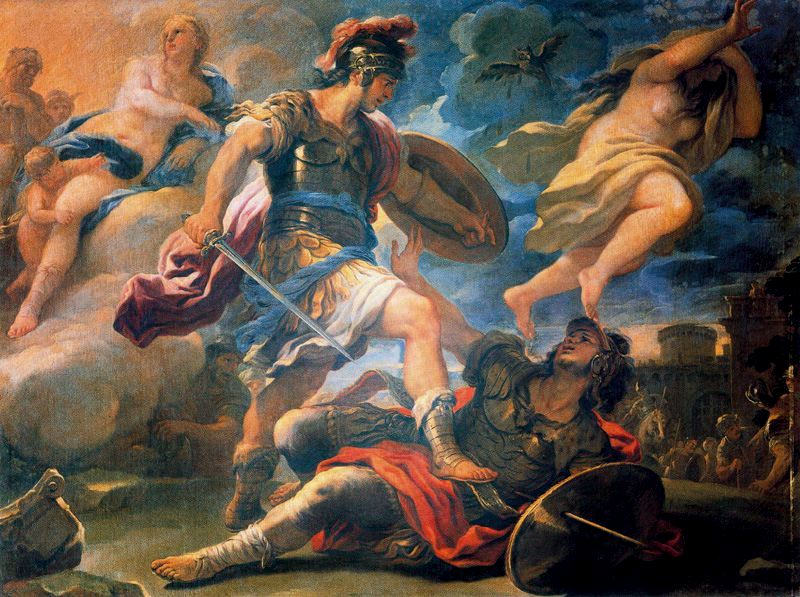
Aeneas defeats Turnus, Luca Giordano, 1634–1705, The genius of Aeneas is shown ascendant, looking into the light of the future, while that of Turnus is setting, shrouded in darkness.

- Tagliacozzo: Site of a defeat by **Manfred**'s nephew Conradin, by **Charles of Anjou**, who, following the advice of his general Erard ("Alardo") de Valery, surprised Conradin, with the use of reserve troops.
  - "Where old Alardo conquered without weapons". **Inf. XXVIII, 17–18**.
- Tarpeian Rock: cliff on the Capitoline Hill in Rome, where an ancient temple to Saturn was located.
  - Compared to the gate of Purgatory. **Purg. IX, 135**.
- Tarquin: Last king of Rome, he was overthrown by **Lucius Junius Brutus**, considered the founder of the Republic.
  - Seen in **Limbo**. **Inf. IV, 121–128**.
- Taurus: Zodiac constellation in the form of a bull.
  - When Dante enters the terrace of the lustful in Purgatory, Taurus is on the meridian line. Hence it is 2 P.M. in Purgatory. **Purg. XXV, 3**.
- Te Deum laudamus: "We praise Thee, O God." Ancient Latin hymn sung in the morning monastic offices. Also sung in special occasions of celebration.
  - Heard by Dante as he enters Purgatory. **Purg. IX, 141**.
- Te lucis ante: "To Thee before the close of day." Latin hymn sung at Compline, the final monastic prayer office of the day.
  - Souls in the "Valley of the Princes" sing the hymn at the end of the day. **Purg. VIII, 13–17**.
- Telemachus: Son of **Odysseus** (Ulysses) and **Penelope**, he plays an important role in the Odyssey. In the lost Telegony he appears to have married **Circe** and been granted immortality.
  - Not even Ulysses' love for his son (and wife and father) was enough to overrule his desire "to gain experience of the world and of the vices and the worth of men". **Inf. XXVI, 94–99**.
- Temple: reference to the Templars, a military order founded during the Crusades.
  - Forcibly dissolved in 1307 by Philip IV of France to obtain their vast wealth. **Purg. XX, 91–93**.
- Terence: Publius Terentius Afer. Roman playwright of the 2nd century BCE.
  - Resident of **Limbo**. **Purg. XXII, 97**.
- Terrestrial Paradise: According to the Comedy, Terrestrial Paradise is the Garden of Eden where the original man and woman first lived. (Gen 2 & 3) It is located at the top of the mountain of Purgatory. The events of Cantos XXVIII through XXXIII in the Purgatorio take place there.
- Thebes: City of Ancient Greece.
  - **Statius** tells Dante and Virgil that he composed the Thebaid, an epic poem on the history of Thebes. "I sang of Thebes." **Purg. XXI, 92**.
- Thaïs: A courtesan in Terence's Eunuchus. Perhaps misled by **Cicero'**s commentary (De amicitia XXVI, 98), he places her among the flatterers.
  - **Virgil** contemptuously calls her "puttana" ("whore"). **Inf. XVIII, 127–135**.
- Thales (c. 635–543 BCE): Greek philosopher.
  - Encountered by Dante in **Limbo**. **Inf. IV, 137**.
- Thaumas: Greek sea god, whose daughter is Iris, the goddess of rainbows.
  - **Statius** comments that rainbows do not occur in Purgatory. **Purg. XXI, 50–51**.
- Themis: Greek goddess of divine justice and one of the Oracles of Delphi.
  - **Beatrice** compares her own obscure oracles about the future to those of Themis or the Sphinx. **Purg. XXXIII, 47**.
- Theobald V of Champagne (c. 1238–1270): The eldest son of Theobald IV of Champagne, on his death in 1253 he succeeded him as Count of Champagne and, as Theobald II, king of Navarre. He died childless in 1270.
  - The "good king Theobald" ("buon re Tebaldo"). **Inf. XXII, 52**.
- Theological Virtues: Virtues granted to believers by God's grace. They include Faith, Hope and Love.
  - Symbolized by three stars visible from Purgatory. **Purg. VIII, 93**.
  - Symbolized by three women dancing at the right wheel of the chariot in the **Pageant of the Church Triumphant**. **Purg. XXIX, 121–129**.
- Theseus: Legendary king of Athens who visited the underworld and, in the version used by Dante, was rescued by Herakles.
  - His name invoked by the **Erinyes**. **Inf. IX, 54**.
  - The "Duke of Athens" who killed the **Minotaur**. **Inf. XII, 17**.
  - Helped to defeat drunken **Centaurs** at Hippodamia's wedding feast. **Purg. XXIV, 23**.
- Thetis: Noble ancient Greek woman. Wife of Peleus and mother of Achilles.
  - Resident of **Limbo**. **Purg. XXII, 113**.
- Thisbe: In a tale by Ovid (Metamorphoses IV, 55–166), Thisbe and Pyramus are lovers in ancient Babylon separated by a wall.
  - Dante alludes to them when a wall of fire separates him from **Beatrice**. **Purg. XXVII, 37–39**.
- Thymbraeus: An epithet of Apollo derived from the town Thymbra, where there was a temple dedicated to him.
  - In Purgatory, Thymbreaus (Apollo) is depicted on the pavement casting **Briareus** from Olympus. **Purg. XII, 31**.
- Tiber: River which runs through Rome and empties into the Tyrrhenian Sea.
  - Souls bound for Purgatory wait on the seashore for the angelic ferry. **Purg. II, 101**.
- Tigris and Euphrates: Rivers in the Middle East. According to Genesis 2, they had their origins in the Garden of Eden.
  - Dante compares these two rivers to the two rivers he sees in **Terrestrial Paradise**. **Purg. XXXIII, 112**.
- Timaeus: A dialogue of Plato where the celestial source and destiny of the human soul are discussed.
  - Beatrice corrects Dante of mistaken ideas he drew from this dialogue. **Par. IV, 22–63**.
- Tiresias: A mythical blind soothsayer who was transformed into a woman and then back into a man, seven years later. He has an important role in classical literature, including the Odyssey.
  - His double transformation is told. **Inf. XX, 40–45**.
  - Father of **Manto**. **Inf. XX, 58**, **Purg. XXII, 113**.
- Tisiphone: see **Erinyes**.
- Tithonus: Trojan lover of Eos, Titan of the Dawn.
  - Mentioned in reference to dawn in Purgatory. **Purg. IX, 1**.
- Titus: Roman Emperor (79–81). As a general, he completed the campaign to put down a Jewish revolt and recapture **Jerusalem** in 70 CE. **Par. VI, 92–93**.
  - **Statius** tells Dante and Virgil that he was from the age of Titus. **Purg. XXI, 82**.
- Tityas: Son of Gaia. Tityus was a giant killed by Zeus for attacking Leto.
  - Seen chained in the "Well of the Giants". **Inf. XXXI, 124**.
- Tobit: Protagonist of the ancient Jewish book of the same name. Tobit is conducted on a journey by the Archangel Raphael.
  - Beatrice tells Dante that Raphael may have appeared in human form, but that this form is an accommodation to the limits of the human imagination. **Par. IV, 48**.
- Tomyris: Queen of the Massagetae in the 6th century BCE. According to Herodotus, Cyrus the Great led a failed invasion of her lands. After his defeat and death in battle, Tomyris plunged his severed head into a wineskin filled with blood.
  - Cyrus' death is depicted on the pavement in Purgatory as an example of arrogance. **Purg. XII, 56**.
- Torquatus: Titus Manlius Torquatus, Consul and Dictator in Rome during the 4th century, BCE.
  - Cited as an example of the noble Roman. **Par. VI, 46**.
- Tours: City in France. **Pope Martin IV** was treasurer of the church there when he was elected pope in 1281.
- Trajan: Roman Emperor (98–117) at the height of the Empire. According to medieval legend, he was posthumously converted to Christianity by Pope Gregory the Great.
  - Appears depicted in a wall carving as an exemplar of humility, granting justice to a widow. **Purg. X, 73–93**.
  - In **Par. XX** in the heaven of Jupiter, he appears alongside other figures noted for justice.
- Troy: Also called Ilium, the site of the Trojan War, described in **Homer'**s Iliad, and the home of **Aeneas**. The Greeks were victorious by means of the wooden Trojan Horse, which the Greeks left as a "gift" for the Trojans. The Trojans brought the horse through the gates into their walled city, and the Greek soldiers who had hid inside the horse were able to open the gates and let in the rest of the Greek army.
  - Aeneas' escape. **Inf. I, 73**.
  - "That horse's fraud that caused a breach". **Inf. XXVI, 58–60**.
  - Trojan (meaning perhaps, through Aeneas, their Samnite descendants) wars in **Apulia**. **Inf. XXVIII, 7–9**.
  - The "pride of Troy ... dared all" but "was destroyed". **Inf. XXX, 13–15**.
  - Destruction of Troy depicted on the pavement in Purgatory as an example of arrogance. **Purg. XII, 61**.
- Tullio/Tully: See **Cicero**.
- Turnus: A chieftain of the Rutuli whose conflict with **Aeneas** is the subject of the second half of the Aeneid, at the end of which he was killed by Aeneas in single combat (Aeneid II, 919)—one of those who "died for Italy". **Inf. I, 106–108**.
- Tristan: Hero of medieval French romance, he was a Cornish Knight of the Round Table, and adulterous lover of Isolde.
  - Found amongst the sexual sinners. **Inf. V, 67**.
- Tuscany: region of Italy where **Florence** is located.
- Typhon: Son of Tartarus and Gaia. Typhon was a giant with a hundred serpent heads.
  - Seen chained in the "Well of the Giants". **Inf. XXXI, 124**.

== U ==
- Ugolino della Gherardesca: Leader of one of two competing **Guelph** factions in Pisa. In 1288 he conspired with the Archbishop Ruggiere degli Ubaldini to oust the leader of the other faction, his grandson Nino de' Visconti. Ugolino was, in turn, betrayed by Ruggiere and imprisoned with several of his sons and grandsons. They all died of starvation in prison.
  - Found with Ruggiere amongst those damned for treason. **Inf. XXXII, 124–XXXIII 90**.
- Ulysses: See **Odysseus**.
- Usury: The practice of charging a fee for the use of money; viewed by the medieval church as a sin because it went contrary to the idea that wealth is based on natural increase, which was believed to be a gift from God.
  - Explained by **Virgil** to Dante. **Inf. XI, 97–111**.
  - The usurers are punished in the seventh circle **Inf. XVII, 34–75**.
- Urania: The ancient **Muse** of Astronomy. She became the Muse of poets describing sacred themes.
  - Dante invokes her in **Purg. XXIX, 41**.

== V ==
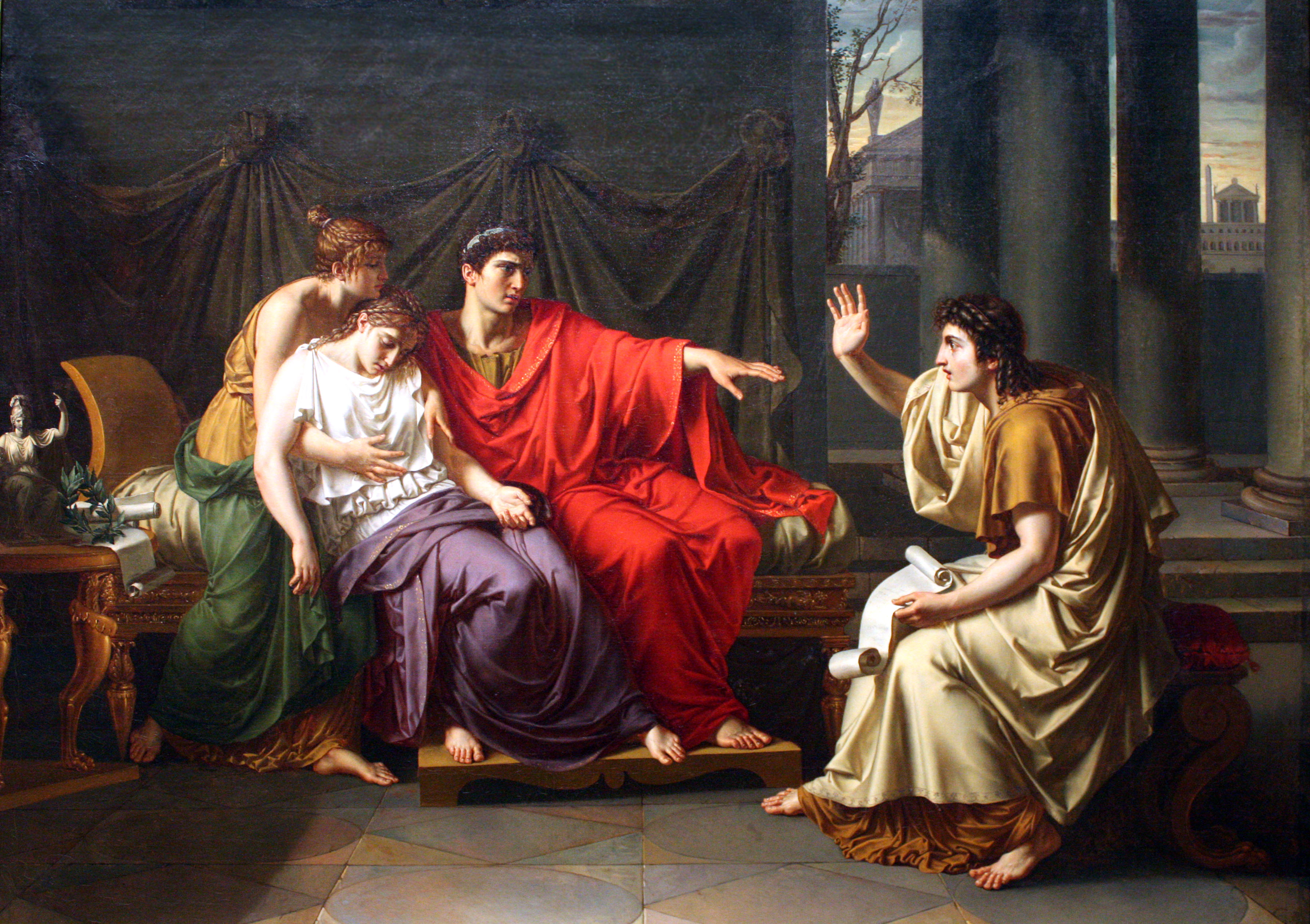
Virgil Reading the Aeneid to Augustus, Octavia, and Livia by Jean-Baptiste Wicar, Art Institute of Chicago

- Varro: Either Publius Terentius Varro or Lucius Varius Rufus. Both were Roman writers of the 1st century BCE.
  - Resident of **Limbo**. **Purg. XXII, 98**.
- Venerable Bede: See **Saint Bede**.
- Venetian Arsenal: Shipyard and naval depot for Venice, built c. 1104, in Castello sestiere, it was one of the most important shipyards in Europe, and was instrumental in maintaining Venice as a great naval power.
  - Described. **Inf. XXI, 7–15**.
- "Veni, sponsa, de Libano" ("Come with me from Lebanon, my spouse.") (Song of Solomon 4:8)
  - Sung by the elders representing the books of the Old Testament in the **Pageant of the Church Triumphant**. **Purg. XXX, 10–12**.
- "Venite, benedicti Patris mei." ("Come, blessed of my Father.") (Mat 25:34)
  - Sung by an angel as Dante finishes the last purgation. **Purg. XXVII, 58**.
- Venus: Roman goddess of love. In Greek mythology she was known as Aphrodite.
  - Dante compares the loving eyes of **Matilda** to those of Venus inspired by her son Cupid.
- Vespers: Evening monastic prayer service. As a reference to a period of time, Vespers is 3 P.M. to 6 P.M.
  - Used to indicate the time of day. **Purg. III, 25; XV, 6; XV, 139.**
- Vexilla regis prodeunt: ("The royal banner draws forth.") Medieval Latin hymn.
  - **Virgil** introduces **Satan** with "Vexilla regis produent inferni" ("the king's banners come out of hell"). **Inf. XXXIV, 1**.
- "Vinum non habent": "They have no wine." (John 2:3) Words spoken by **Mary** to **Jesus** at the wedding feast at Cana to prompt him to supply more wine for the feast.
  - Heard by souls in the terrace of the envious as a lesson in generosity. **Purg. XIII, 29**.
- "Virum non cognosco": ("I have not known a man.") The Virgin **Mary's** response to the angel's announcement of the virgin birth of her son **Jesus**.
  - Recited penitentially by souls on the terrace of the lustful in Purgatory. **Purg. XXV, 128**.
- Volto Santo ("Holy face") of Lucca: An early Byzantine crucifix made of very dark wood, greatly venerated as having been miraculously created.
  - Used by the **Malebranche** to mock the pitch-blackened face and body of one of the **barrators** (perhaps **Bottario**). **Inf. XXI, 46–48**.
- Virgil (Publius Vergilius Maro) (70–19 BCE): Latin poet. He serves as Dante's guide through the Inferno and Purgatorio. In the absence of texts of **Homer**, the readers in the Middle Ages considered Virgil's Aeneid to be the great epic poem of the Classical world. In Dante's time, many believed that Virgil had predicted the arrival of Christianity in lines from his Eclogue IV: "at the boy's birth in whom/the iron shall cease, the golden race arise" (trans John Dryden). This made him doubly suited to his role as guide. He also symbolises Reason. Virgil accompanies Dante from **Inf. I, 61** to **Purg. XXX, 54**.
  - Sudden appearance. **Inf. I, 61–63**
  - The "light and honor of all other poets" (Mandelbaum). **Inf. I, 82**
  - Dante's inspiration. **Inf. I, 85–87**
  - Offers to be Dante's guide. **Inf. I, 112–114**
  - In Purgatory, the poet **Statius** claims that Virgil's Aeneid was his poetic inspiration. It was my "mother" and my "nurse." **Purg. XXI, 97–98**.
  - In a story created by Dante, **Statius** relates how reading Virgil's Eclogue IV helped to convert him to Christianity. "Per te poeta fui, per te cristiano." ("Through you I became a poet; through you a Christian.") There is no evidence that Statius was a Christian. **Purg. XXII, 64–93**.
  - Departs from Dante without saying farewell. **Purg. XXX, 49–54**.
- Vitaliano del Dente: Paduan banker, he was podestà of Vicenza in 1304 and of Padua in 1307.
  - His future damnation as a **usurer** is foretold by **Reginaldo Scrovegni**. **Inf. XVII, 68–69**.
- Vulcan: In Roman mythology, blacksmith of the gods and, with the help of the **Cyclops**, maker of thunderbolts for **Jove**.
  - From whom Jove "took in wrath the keen-edged thunderbolt". **Inf. XIV, 52–57**.

== W ==
- Wenceslaus II of Bohemia (1278–1305).
  - Dantes sees him with his father Ottokar II in the "Valley of the Princes". He is a late-repenter waiting to enter Purgatory. **Purg. VII, 102**.

== Z ==
- Michele Zanche (died 1290): Governor of the giudicato of Logudoro, in Sardinia. He administered the province for King Enzo, son of the Emperor Frederick II. When Enzo was made prisoner in 1249, his wife divorced and married Zanche. The latter ruled Logudoro until 1290, when he was murdered by his son-in-law Branca Doria.
  - Among the **barrators**. **Inf. XXII, 88–90**.
- Zion: Mountain in **Jerusalem** where Solomon's Temple was constructed.
  - Used as a metonym for Jerusalem. **Purg. IV, 69, 75**.
- Zeno of Elea (c. 490 – c. 430 BCE): Greek presocratic philosopher.
  - Encountered by Dante in **Limbo**. **Inf. IV, 138**.
- Zeus (also Jove or Jupiter): Chief god of Classical mythology.
  - Defied by **Capaneus**, he kills him with a thunderbolt. **Inf XIV, 43–75.**
  - An **Eagle** ("the bird of Jove"), representing the Roman Empire, attacks the young Church in the **Pageant of Church History**. **Purg. XXXII, 109–117.**
- Saint Zita (c. 1215–1272): Canonized in 1696, she is the Patroness saint of all maids and domestics. In her city, **Lucca**, she was already, in life, an object of popular devotion and reputed a saint. In Dante's time, her fame had already made her a sort of patroness saint of her city. The Elders of Saint Zita were ten citizens of Lucca who, along with the chief magistrate, were the rulers of the city.
  - An "elder of Saint Zita" (perhaps **Bottario**) is plunged into a lake of boiling pitch with the **barrators**. **Inf. XXI, 35–54**.
