= Primum Mobile =

Outermost moving sphere in the geocentric model of the universe

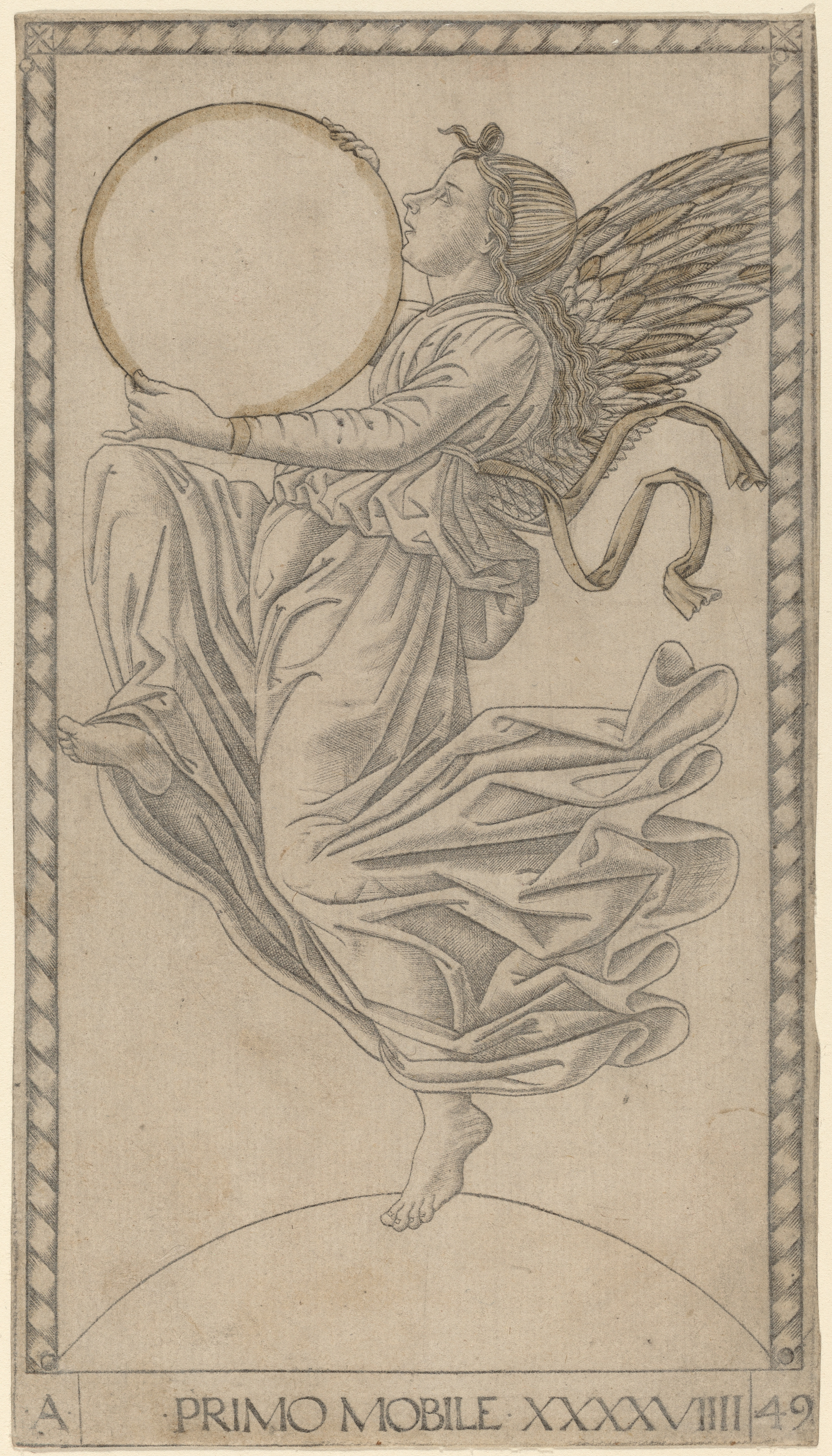
The angel of the Primum Mobile from the E-Series of the so-called Mantegna Tarocchi

In classical, medieval, and Renaissance astronomy, the Primum Mobile (Latin: "first movable") was the outermost moving sphere in the geocentric model of the universe.

The concept was introduced by Ptolemy to account for the apparent daily motion of the heavens around the Earth, producing the east-to-west rising and setting of the sun and stars, and reached Western Europe via Avicenna.

== Appearance and rotation ==
The Ptolemaic system presented a view of the universe in which apparent motion was taken for real – a viewpoint still maintained in common speech through such everyday terms as moonrise and sunset. Rotation of the Earth on its polar axis – as seen in a heliocentric solar system, which (while anticipated by Aristarchus) was not to be widely accepted until well after Copernicus – leads to what earlier astronomers saw as the real movement of all the heavenly bodies around the Earth every 24 hours.

Astronomers believed that the seven naked-eye planets (including the Moon and the Sun) were carried around the spherical Earth on invisible orbs, while an eighth sphere contained the fixed stars. Motion was provided to the whole system by the Primum Mobile, itself set within the Empyrean, and the fastest moving of all the spheres.

== Spherical variations ==
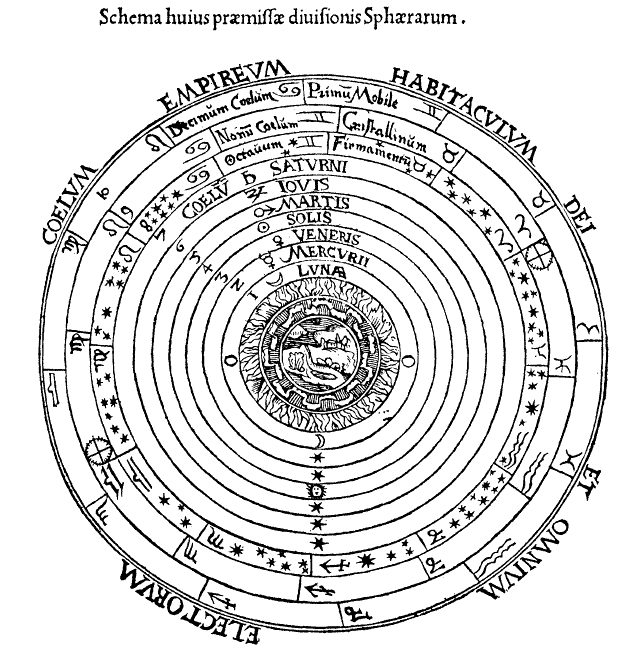
One scheme of the celestial spheres

The total number of celestial spheres was not fixed. In this 16th-century illustration, the firmament (sphere of fixed stars) is eighth, a "crystalline" sphere (posited to account for the reference to "waters ... above the firmament" in Genesis 1:7) is ninth, and the Primum Mobile is tenth. Outside all is the Empyrean, the "habitation of God and all the elect".

== Copernicus and after ==
Copernicus accepted existence of the sphere of the fixed stars, and (more ambiguously) that of the Primum Mobile, as too (initially) did Galileo – though he would later challenge its necessity in a heliocentric system.

Francis Bacon was as sceptical of the Primum Mobile as he was of the rotation of the earth. Once Kepler had made the sun, not the Primum Mobile, the cause of planetary motion, however, the Primum Mobile gradually declined into the realm of metaphor or literary allusion.

== Literary references ==
- Dante made the Primum Mobile the ninth of the ten heavens into which he divided his Paradiso.
- In Geoffrey Chaucer's "Man of Law's Tale", the Primum Mobile is apostrophized: "O firste moevyng! crueel firmament, / With thy diurnal sweigh that crowdest ay / And hurlest al from est til occident / That naturelly wolde holde another way ..." (ll. 295–298).
- W. B. Yeats wrote: "The Primum Mobile that fashioned us / Has made the very owls in circles move."
- John Ciardi wrote: "One night I dreamed I was locked in my Father's watch / With Ptolemy and twenty-one ruby stars / Mounted on spheres and the Primum Mobile / Coiled and gleaming to the end of space."

== See also ==
- Firmament
- Unmoved mover
