= Paradiso =

Third part of Dante's Divine Comedy

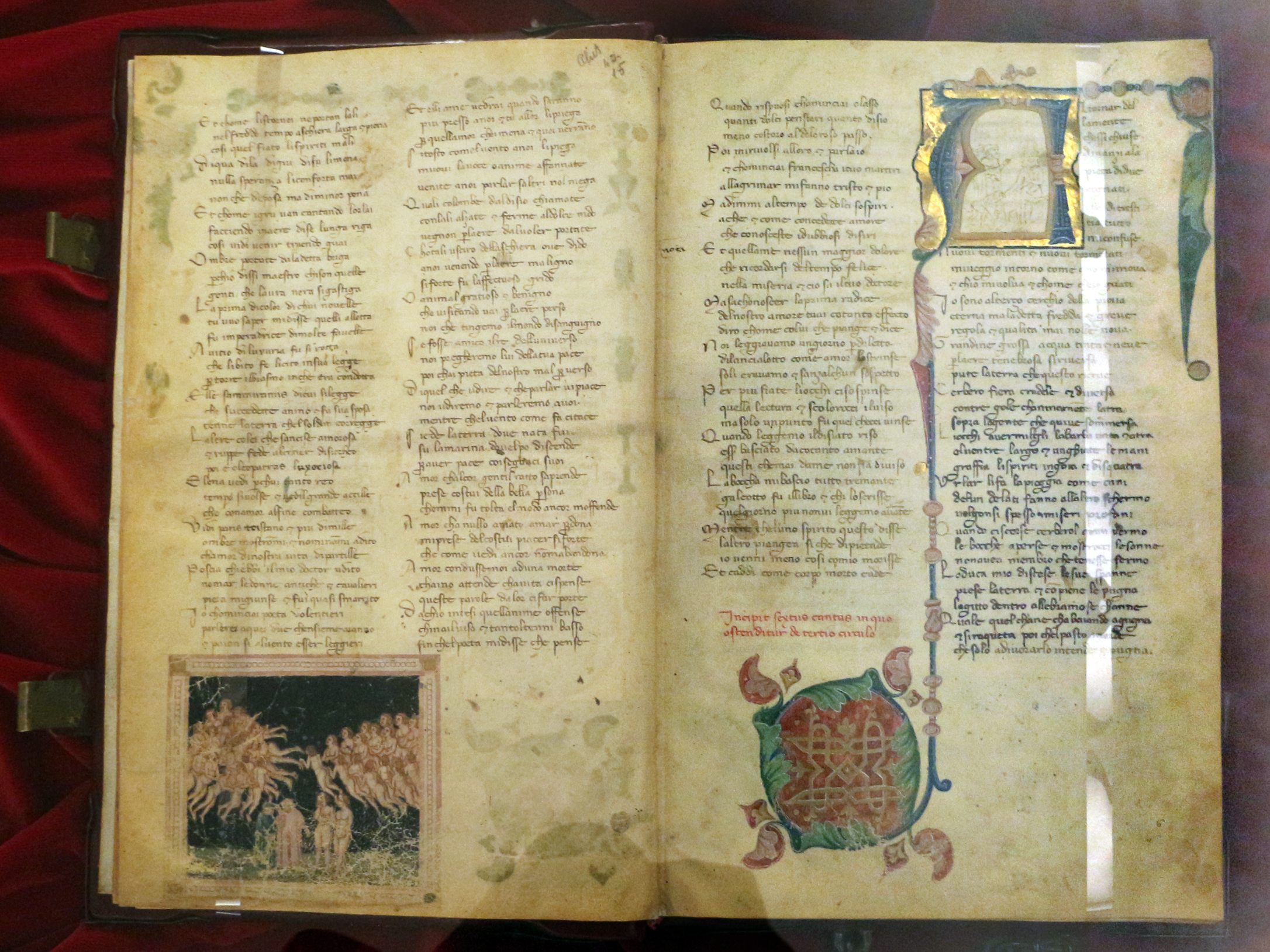
- A page of the Paradiso at the Laurentian Library
- Author: Dante Alighieri
- Language: Italian
- Series: Divine Comedy
- Genre: narrative poem
- Publication date: c. 1321
- Publication place: Italy
- Text: Paradiso at Wikisource

Paradiso (Italian: [paraˈdiːzo]; Italian for "Paradise" or "Heaven") is the third and final part of Dante's Divine Comedy, following the Inferno and the Purgatorio. It is an allegory telling of Dante's journey through Heaven, guided by Beatrice, who symbolises Christian grace or revelation. In the poem, Paradise is depicted as a series of concentric spheres surrounding the Earth, consisting of the Moon, Mercury, Venus, the Sun, Mars, Jupiter, Saturn, the Fixed Stars, the Primum Mobile and finally, the Empyrean. It was written in the early 14th century. Allegorically, the poem represents the soul's ascent to God.

== Composition ==
Though the precise dates of composition are uncertain, research by Giorgio Petrocchi suggests that Dante began planning Paradiso while revising Inferno and Purgatorio from 1313 to 1317. It was likely not published until after Dante's death. Giovanni Boccaccio claimed that Paradiso was initially thought unfinished at Dante's death until his sons discovered the final thirteen cantos among his papers.

Scholars such as Robert Hollander suggest that Dante may not have finished his revisions to the poem before his death; Hollander points to subtle contradictions in the poem not present in the first two cantiche, suggesting that Paradiso lacks the "'finished' quality" of the first two. Stylistically, the poem often diverges significantly from the first two cantiche, featuring far fewer characters (there are fewer than twenty speakers in Paradiso compared to over fifty in each of the two prior cantiche), far longer individual speeches, and a greater emphasis on philosophical discourse. Structurally, it matches the prior two cantiche, featuring thirty-three cantos traversing one portion of the afterlife--here, Dante is led through the nine heavenly bodies before reaching the nonphysical Empyrean.

== Introduction ==
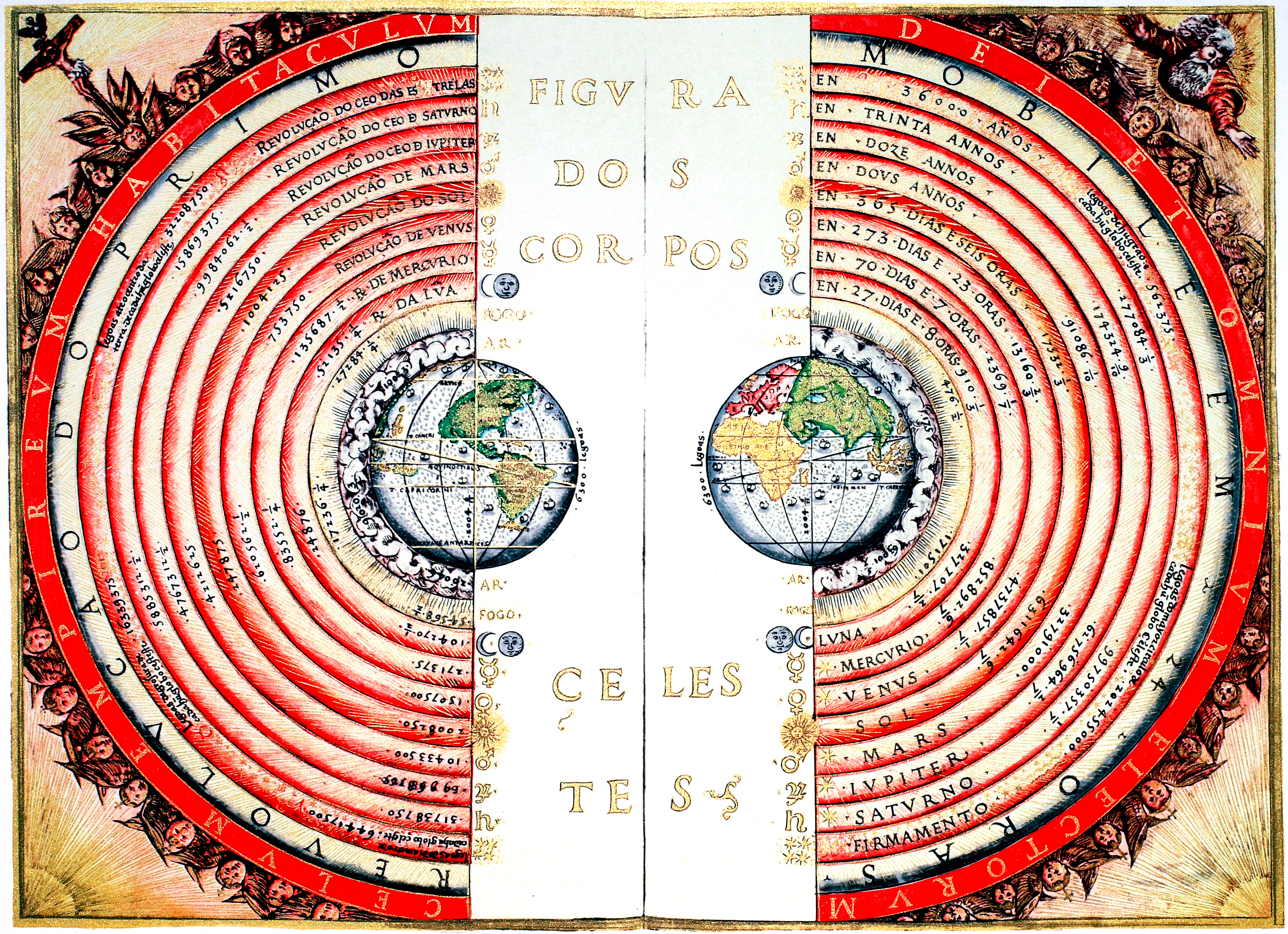
The Paradiso assumes the medieval view of the Universe, with the Earth surrounded by concentric spheres containing planets and stars.

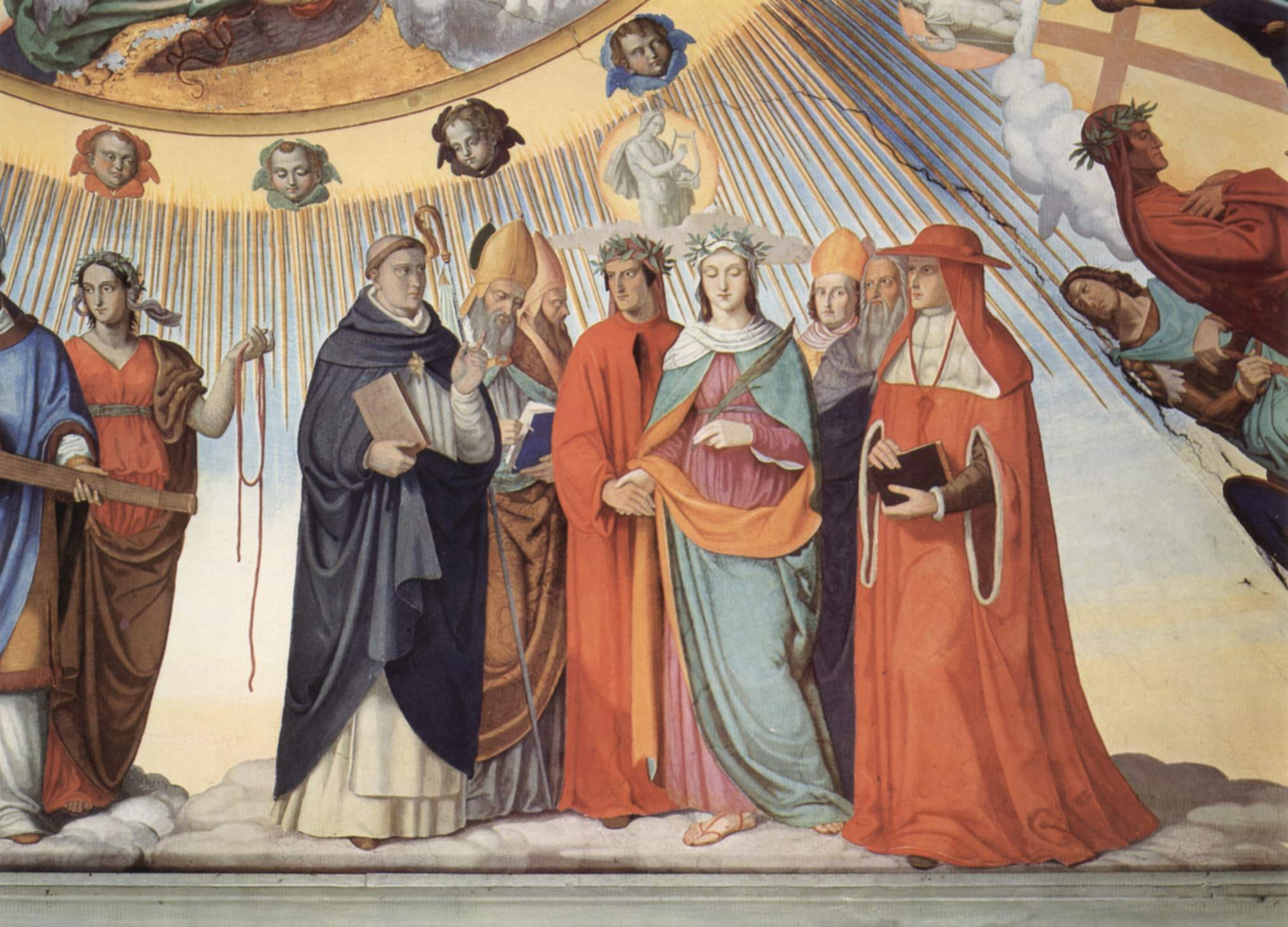
Dante and Beatrice speak to the teachers of wisdom Thomas Aquinas, Albertus Magnus, Peter Lombard and Sigier of Brabant in the Sphere of the Sun (fresco by Philipp Veit), Canto 10.

The Paradiso begins at the top of Mount Purgatory, called the Earthly Paradise (i.e. the Garden of Eden), at noon on Wednesday, March 30 (or April 13), 1300, following Easter Sunday. Dante's journey through Paradise takes approximately twenty-four hours, which indicates that the entire journey of the Divine Comedy lasts one week, Thursday evening (Inferno I and II) to Thursday evening.

After ascending through the sphere of fire believed to exist in the earth's upper atmosphere (Canto I), Beatrice guides Dante through the nine celestial spheres of Heaven, to the Empyrean, which is the abode of God. The nine spheres are concentric, as in the standard medieval geocentric model of cosmology, which was derived from Ptolemy. The Empyrean is non-material. As with his Purgatory, the structure of Dante's Heaven is therefore of the form 9+1=10, with one of the ten regions different in nature from the other nine.

During the course of his journey, Dante meets and converses with several blessed souls. He is careful to say that these all actually live in bliss with God in the Empyrean:

But all those souls grace the Empyrean;
and each of them has gentle life though some
sense the Eternal Spirit more, some less.

However, for Dante's benefit (and the benefit of his readers), he is "as a sign" shown various souls in planetary and stellar spheres that have some appropriate connotation.

While the structures of the Inferno and Purgatorio were based around different classifications of sin, the structure of the Paradiso is based on the four cardinal virtues (Prudence, Justice, Temperance, and Fortitude) and the three theological virtues (Faith, Hope, and Charity).

== The Spheres of Heaven ==
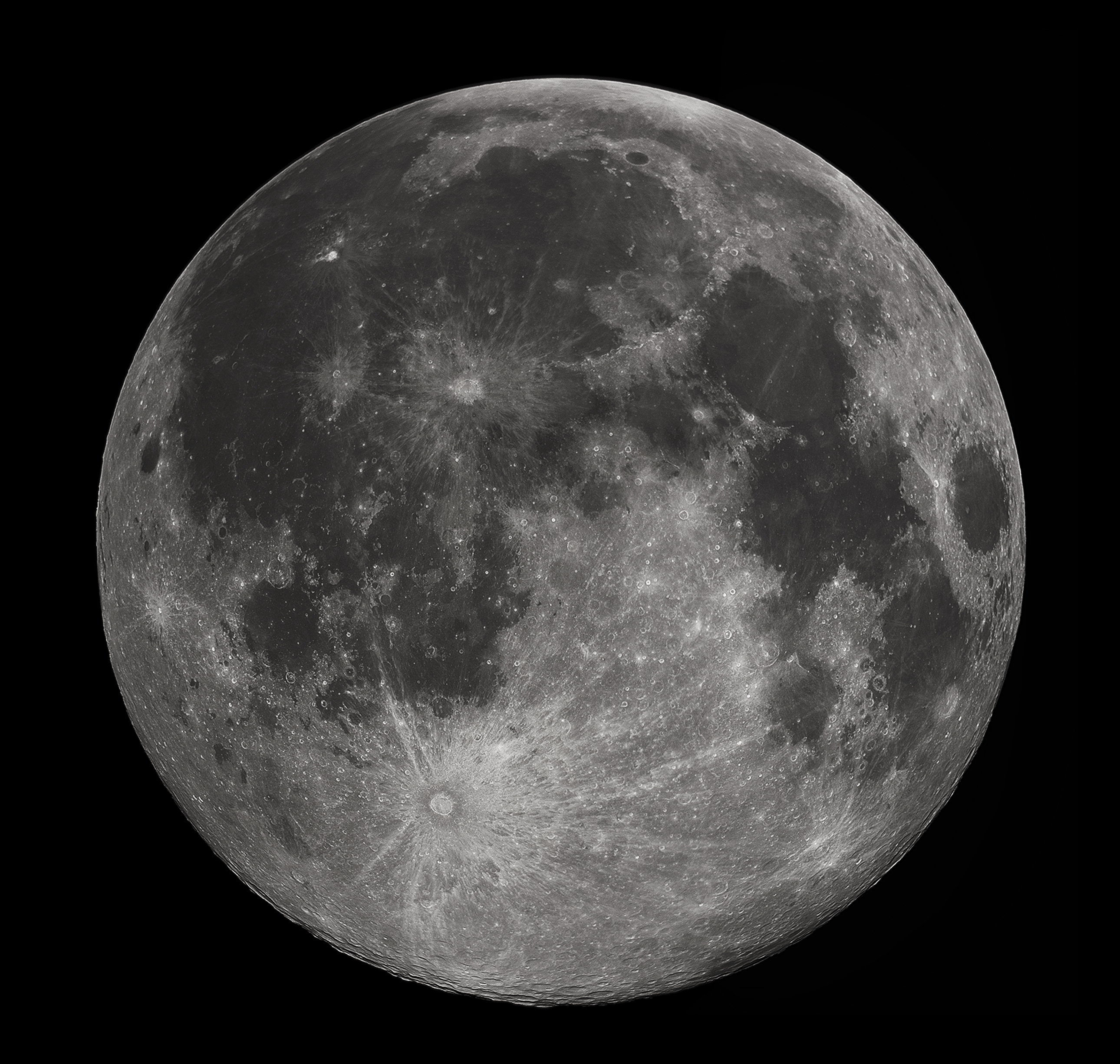
On visiting the Moon, Beatrice explains to Dante the reasons for its markings, Canto 2.

Dante's nine spheres of Heaven are the Moon, Mercury, Venus, the Sun, Mars, Jupiter, Saturn, the Fixed Stars, and the Primum Mobile. These are associated by Dante with the nine levels of the angelic hierarchy. Dante also relies on traditional associations, such as the one between Venus and romantic love. The first three spheres (which fall within the shadow of the Earth) are associated with deficient forms of Fortitude, Justice, and Temperance. The next four are associated with positive examples of Prudence, Fortitude, Justice, and Temperance; while Faith, Hope, and Love appear together in the eighth sphere.

=== First Sphere (The Moon: The Inconstant) ===
When visiting the Moon, Beatrice explains to Dante the reasons for the markings on its surface, describing a simple scientific experiment in optics. She also praises the experimental method in general (Canto II):

Yet an experiment, were you to try it,
could free you from your cavil, and the source
of your arts' course springs from experiment.

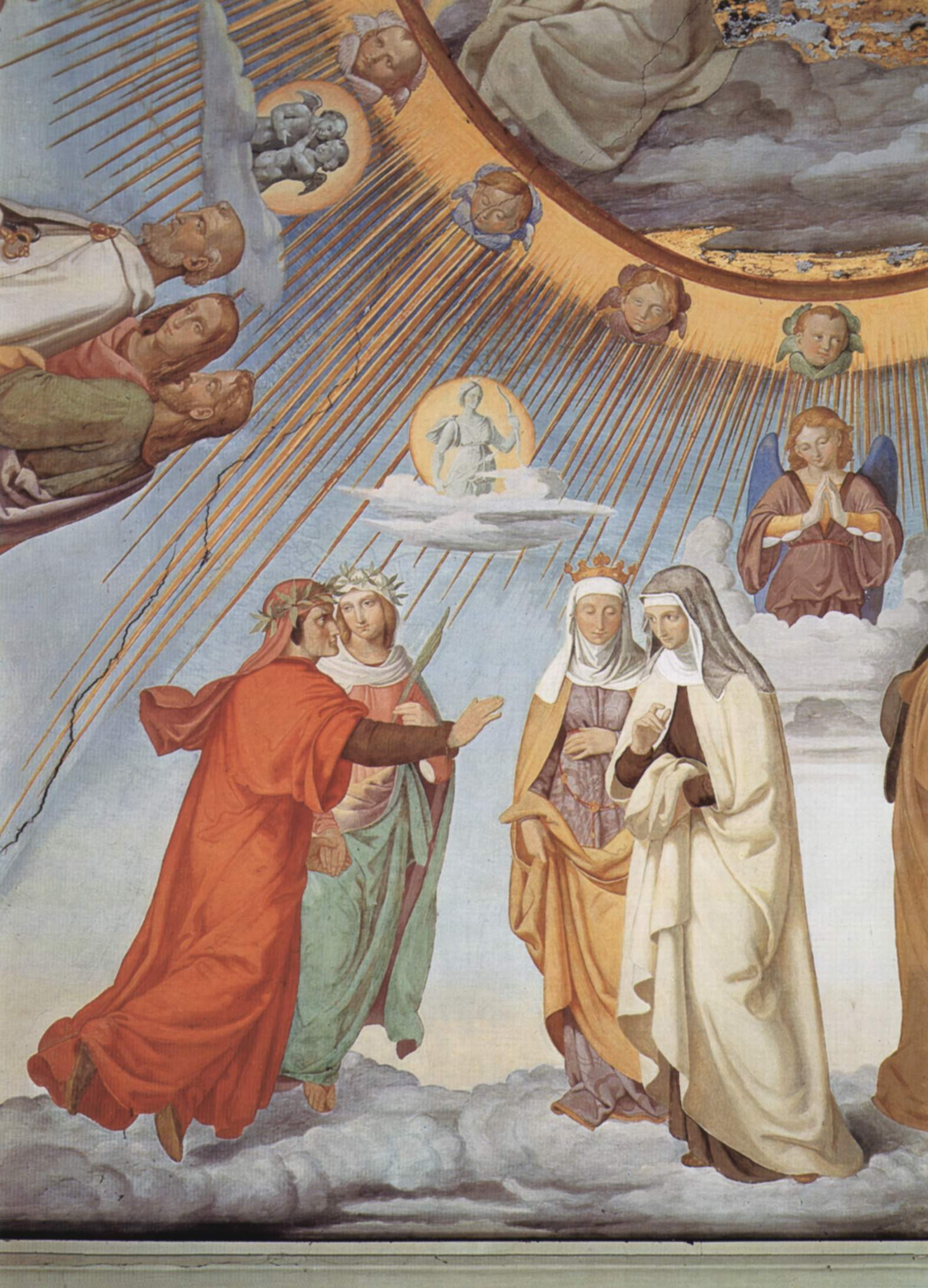
Dante and Beatrice speak to Piccarda and Constance (fresco by Philipp Veit), Canto 3.

The waxing and waning of the moon is associated with inconstancy. Consequently, the sphere of the Moon is that of souls who abandoned their vows, and so were deficient in the virtue of fortitude. Here Dante and Beatrice meet Piccarda, sister of Dante's friend Forese Donati, who died shortly after being forcibly removed from her convent. They also meet Constance of Sicily, who (Dante believes) was forcibly removed from a convent to marry Henry VI (Canto III). Beatrice discourses on the freedom of the will, the sacredness of vows, and the importance of not collaborating with force (Canto IV):

for will, if it resists, is never spent,
but acts as nature acts when fire ascends,
though force a thousand times tries to compel.

So that, when will has yielded much or little,
it has abetted force as these souls did:
they could have fled back to their holy shelter.

Beatrice explains that a vow is a pact "drawn between a man / and God," in which a person freely offers up his free will as a gift to God. Vows should therefore not be taken lightly, and should be kept once given – unless keeping the vow would be a greater evil, as with Jephthah's and Agamemnon's sacrifice of their daughters (Canto V).

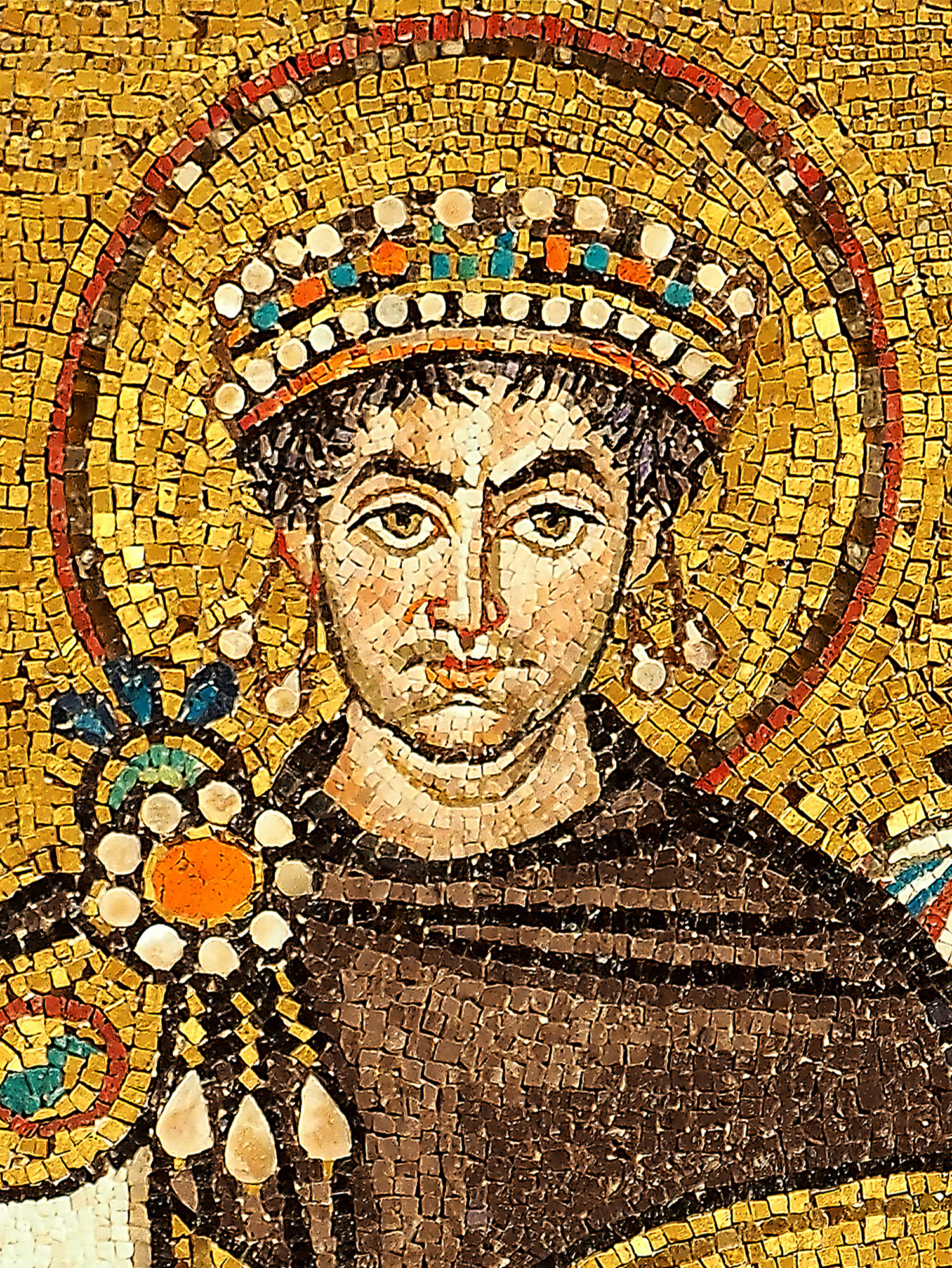
Dante meets the Emperor Justinian in the Sphere of Mercury, Canto 5.

=== Second Sphere (Mercury: The Ambitious) ===
Because of its proximity to the sun, the planet Mercury is often difficult to see. Allegorically, the planet represents those who did good out of a desire for fame, but who, being ambitious, were deficient in the virtue of justice. Their earthly glory pales into insignificance beside the glory of God, just as Mercury pales into insignificance beside the sun. Here Dante meets the Emperor Justinian, who introduces himself with the words "Caesar I was and am Justinian," indicating that his personality remains, but that his earthly status no longer exists in Heaven (Canto VI). Justinian recounts the history of the Roman Empire, mentioning, among others, Julius Caesar and Cleopatra; and bemoans the present state of Italy, given the conflict between Guelphs and Ghibellines, and the involvement of the "yellow lilies" of France (Canto VI):

For some oppose the universal emblem
with yellow lilies; others claim that emblem
for party: it is hard to see who is worse.

Let Ghibellines pursue their undertakings
beneath another sign, for those who sever
this sign and justice are bad followers.

By association, Beatrice discourses on the Incarnation and the Crucifixion of Christ, which occurred during Roman times (Canto VII).

=== Third Sphere (Venus: The Lovers) ===
The planet Venus (the Morning and Evening Star) is traditionally associated with the Goddess of Love, and so Dante makes this the planet of the lovers, who were deficient in the virtue of temperance (Canto VIII):

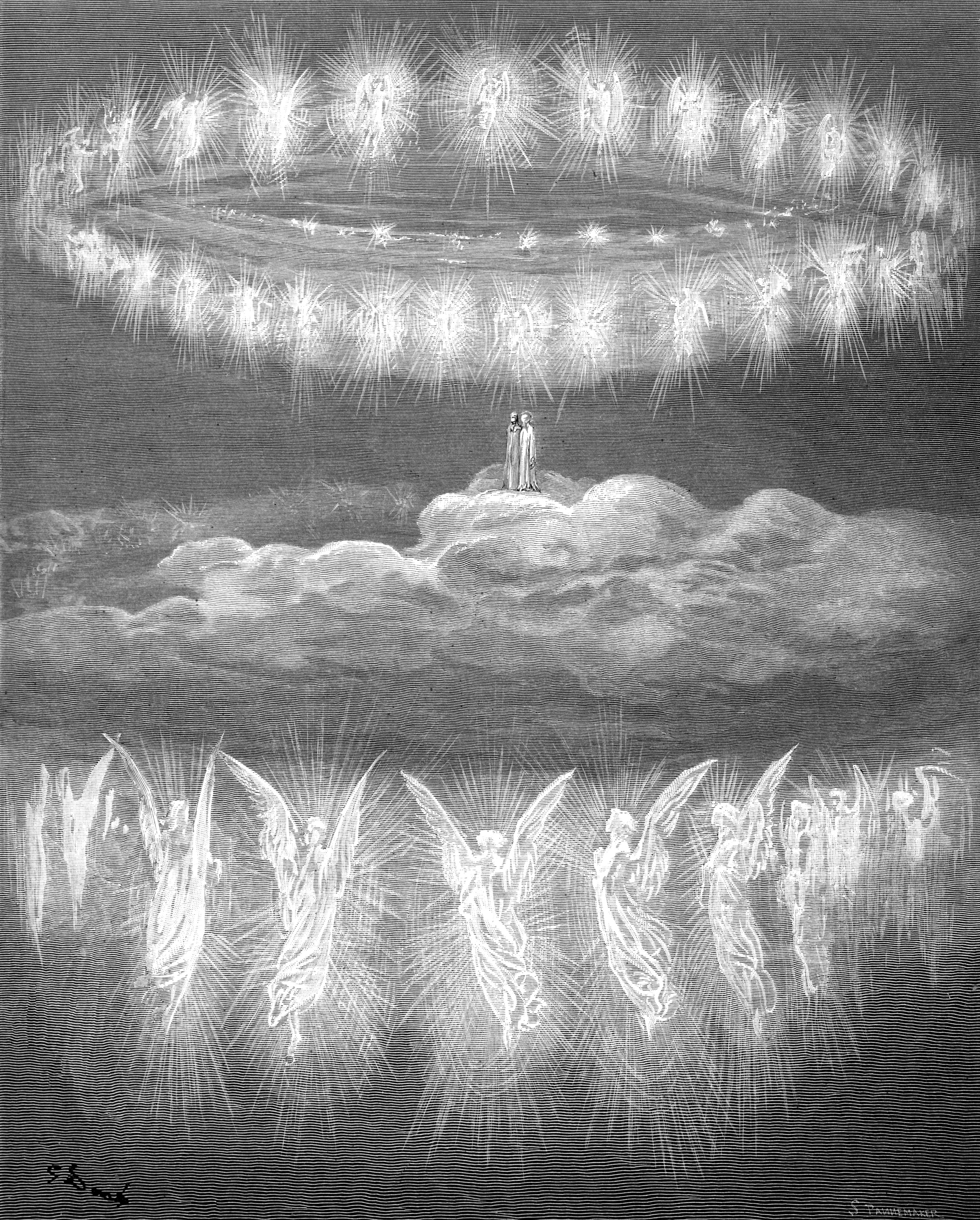
Illustration for Paradiso by Gustave Dore.

The world, when still in peril, thought that, wheeling,
in the third epicycle, Cyprian
the fair sent down her rays of frenzied love,

... and gave the name of her
with whom I have begun this canto, to
the planet that is courted by the sun,
at times behind her and at times in front.

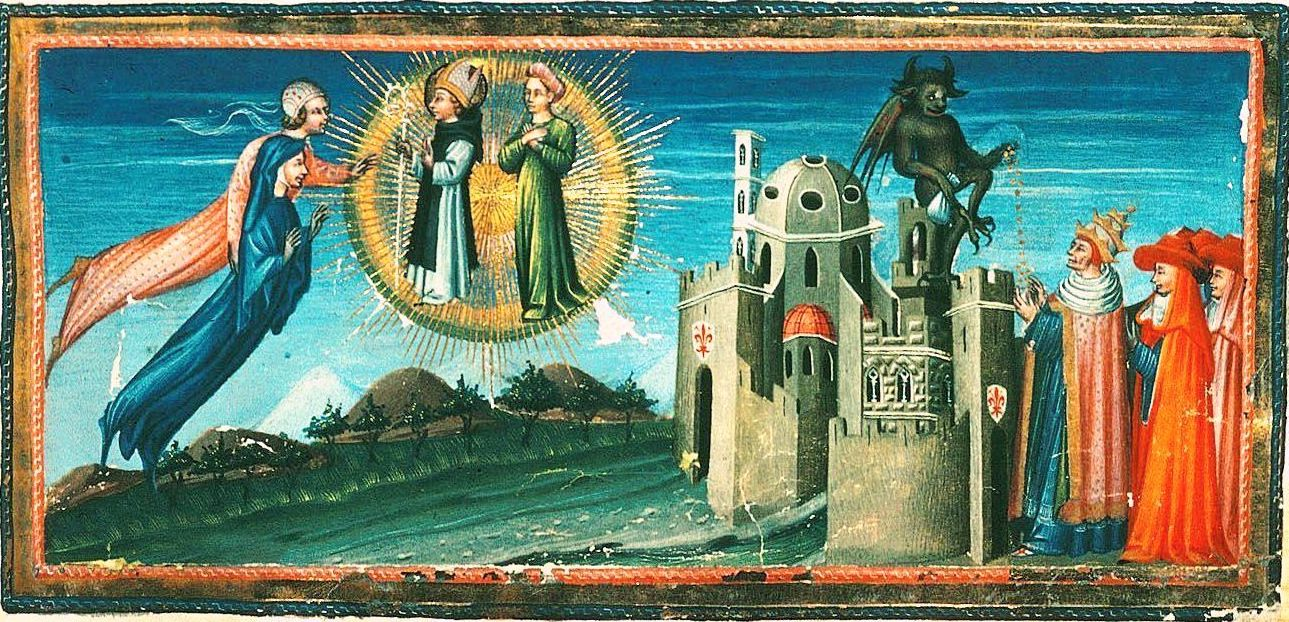
Folquet de Marseilles bemoans the corruption of the Church, with the clergy receiving money from Satan (miniature by Giovanni di Paolo), Canto 9.

Dante meets Charles Martel of Anjou, who was known to him, and who points out that a properly functioning society requires people of many different kinds. Such differences are illustrated by Cunizza da Romano (lover of Sordello), who is here in Heaven, while her brother Ezzelino III da Romano is in Hell, among the violent of the seventh circle.

The troubadour Folquet de Marseilles speaks of the temptations of love, and points out that (as was believed at the time) the cone of the Earth's shadow just touches the sphere of Venus. He condemns the city of Florence (planted, he says, by Satan) for producing that "damned flower" (the florin) which is responsible for the corruption of the Church, and he criticises the clergy for their focus on money, rather than on Scripture and the writings of the Church Fathers (Canto IX):

Your city, which was planted by that one
who was the first to turn against his Maker,
the one whose envy cost us many tears

produces and distributes the damned flower
that turns both sheep and lambs from the true course,
for of the shepherd it has made a wolf.

For this the Gospel and the great Church Fathers
are set aside and only the Decretals
are studied as their margins clearly show.

On these the pope and cardinals are intent.
Their thoughts are never bent on Nazareth,
where Gabriel's open wings were reverent.

=== Fourth Sphere (The Sun: The Wise) ===
Beyond the shadow of the Earth, Dante deals with positive examples of Prudence, Justice, Temperance, and Fortitude. Within the Sun, which is the Earth's source of illumination, Dante meets the greatest examples of prudence: the souls of the wise, who help to illuminate the world intellectually (Canto X). Initially, a circle of twelve bright lights dance around Dante and Beatrice. These are the souls of:

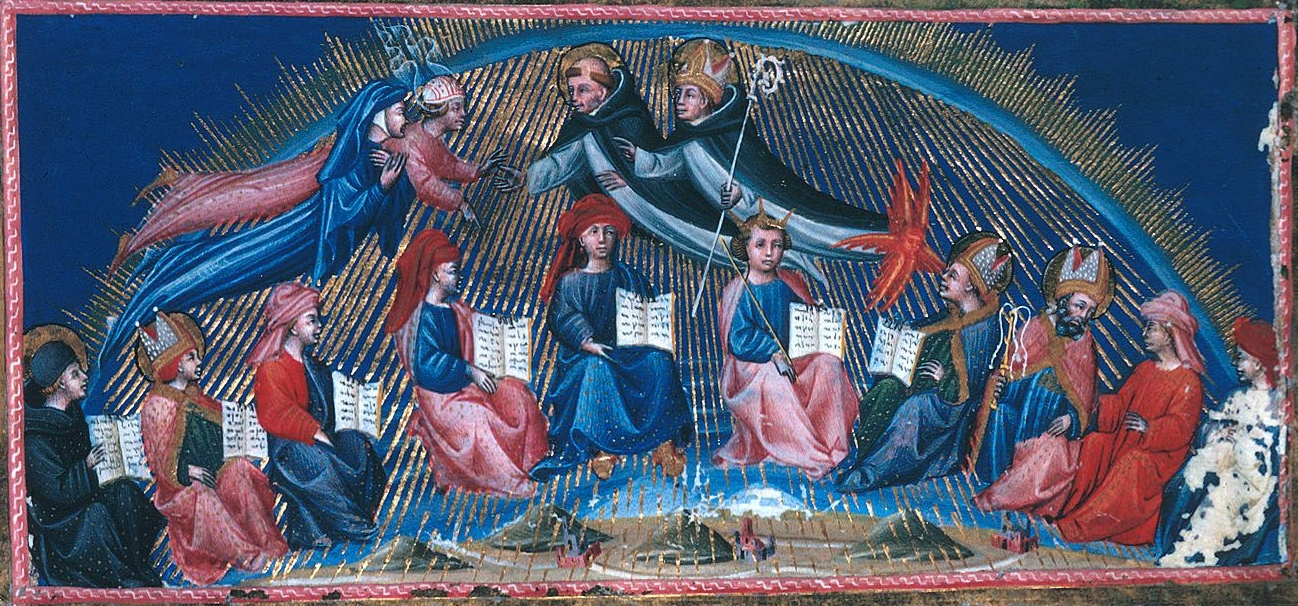
Dante and Beatrice meet twelve wise men in the Sphere of the Sun (miniature by Giovanni di Paolo), Canto 10.

- Thomas Aquinas
- Albertus Magnus
- Gratian
- Peter Lombard
- King Solomon
- Dionysius the Areopagite (Dante likely believed the saint and pseudepigraphical author of De Coelesti Hierarchia, Pseudo-Dionysius the Areopagite, were the same person.)
- Orosius
- Boethius
- Isidore of Seville
- Bede
- Richard of Saint Victor
- Siger of Brabant

This list includes philosophers, theologians and a king, and has representatives from across Europe. Thomas Aquinas recounts the life of St. Francis of Assisi, and his love for "Lady Poverty" (Canto XI):

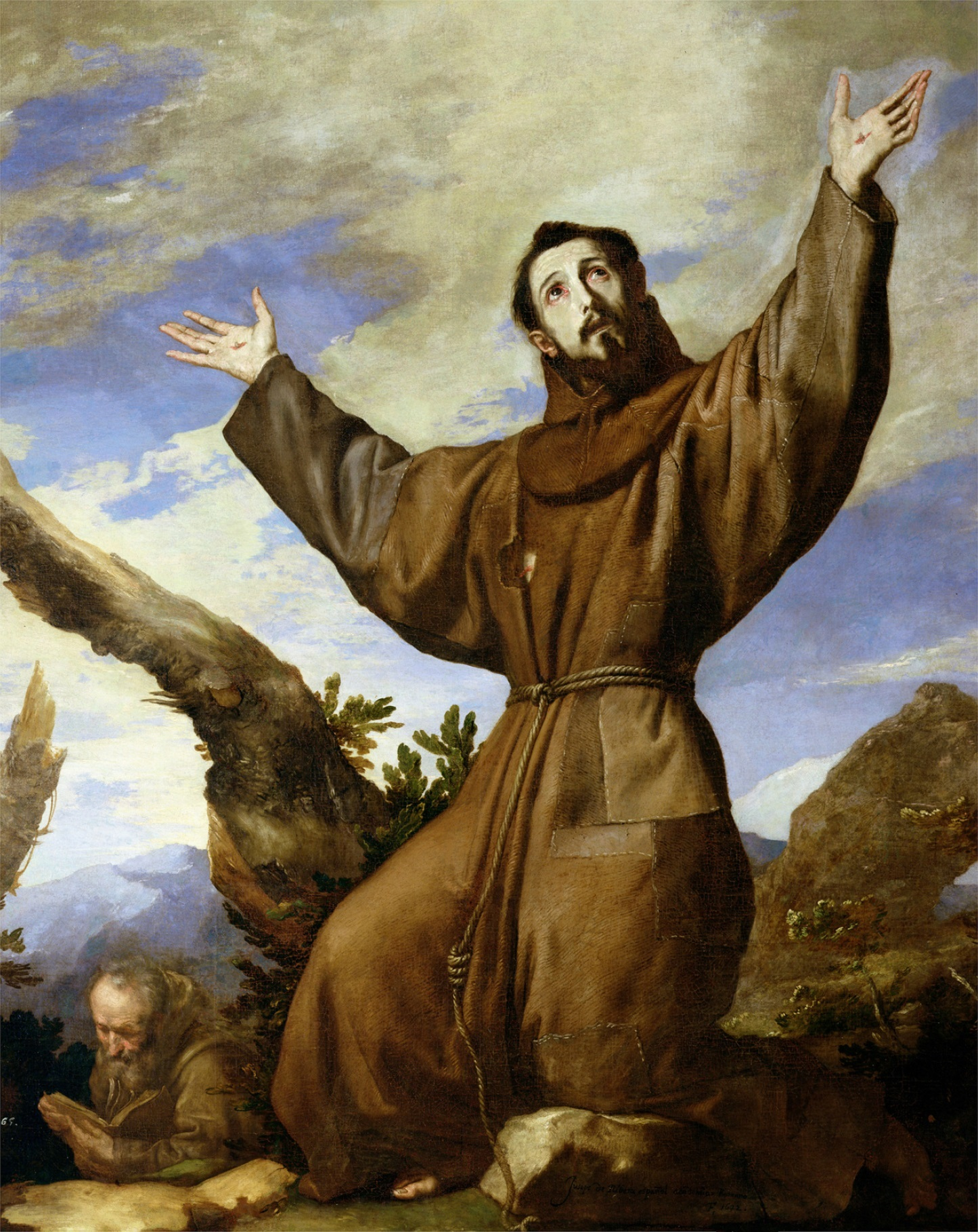
St. Francis, whose life is recounted by Aquinas (painting by Jusepe de Ribera), Canto 11

Between Topino's stream and that which flows
down from the hill the blessed Ubaldo chose,
from a high peak there hangs a fertile slope;

from there Perugia feels both heat and cold
at Porta Sole, while behind it sorrow
Nocera and Gualdo under their hard yoke.

From this hillside, where it abates its rise,
a sun was born into the world, much like
this sun when it is climbing from the Ganges.

Therefore let him who names this site not say
Ascesi, which would be to say too little,
but Orient, if he would name it rightly.

Twelve new bright lights appear, one of which is St. Bonaventure, a Franciscan, who recounts the life of St. Dominic, founder of the order to which Aquinas belonged. The two orders were not always friendly on earth, and having members of one order praising the founder of the other shows the love present in Heaven (Canto XII). The twenty-four bright lights revolve around Dante and Beatrice, singing of the Trinity, and Aquinas explains the surprising presence of King Solomon, who is placed here for kingly, rather than philosophical or mathematical wisdom (Cantos XIII and XIV):

My words did not prevent your seeing clearly
that it was as a king that he had asked
for wisdom that would serve his royal task

and not to know the number of the angels
on high or, if combined with a contingent,
necesse ever can produce necesse,

or si est dare primum motum esse,
or if, within a semicircle, one
can draw a triangle with no right angle.

=== Fifth Sphere (Mars: The Warriors of the Faith) ===
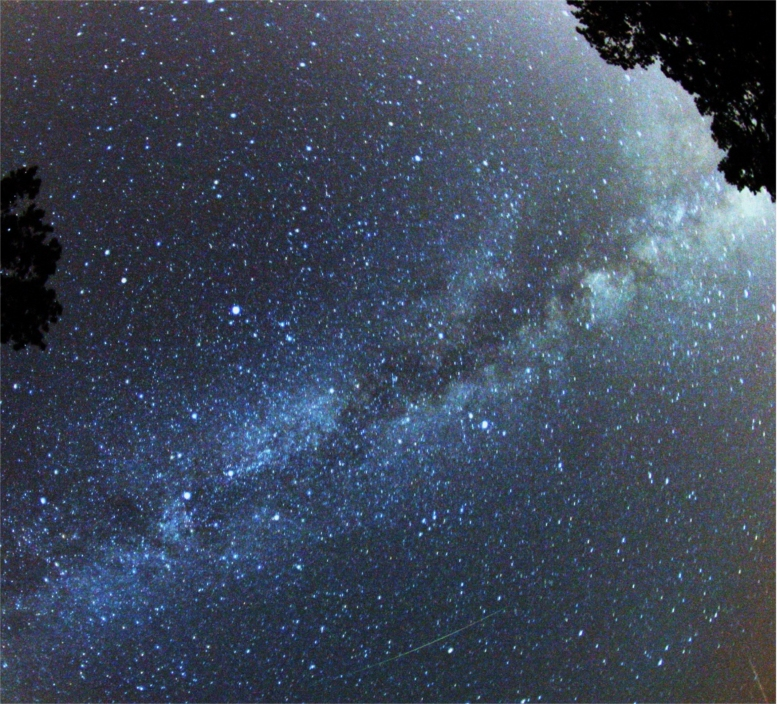
The souls in the Fifth Sphere form a Greek cross, which Dante compares to the Milky Way, Canto 14.

The planet Mars is traditionally associated with the God of War, and so Dante makes this planet the home of the warriors of the Faith, who gave their lives for God, thereby displaying the virtue of fortitude. The millions of sparks of light that are the souls of these warriors form a Greek cross on the planet Mars, and Dante compares this cross to the Milky Way (Canto XIV):

As, graced with lesser and with larger lights
between the poles of the world, the Galaxy
gleams so that even sages are perplexed;

so, constellated in the depth of Mars,
those rays described the venerable sign
a circle's quadrants form where they are joined.

Dante says that sages are "perplexed" by the nature of the Milky Way, but in his Convivio, he had described its nature fairly well:

What Aristotle said on this matter cannot be known with certainty. In the Old Translation he says that the Galaxy is nothing but a multitude of fixed stars in that region, so small that we are unable to distinguish them from here below, though from them originates the appearance of that brightness which we call the Galaxy; this may be so, for the heaven in that region is denser, and therefore retains and throws back this light. Avicenna and Ptolemy seem to share this opinion with Aristotle.

Dante meets his ancestor Cacciaguida, who served in the Second Crusade. Cacciaguida praises the twelfth-century Republic of Florence, and bemoans the way in which the city has declined since those days (Cantos XV and XVI). The setting of the Divine Comedy in the year 1300, before Dante's exile, has allowed characters in the poem to "foretell" bad things for Dante. In response to a question from Dante, Cacciaguida speaks the truth bluntly. Dante will be exiled (Canto XVII):

You shall leave everything you love most dearly:
this is the arrow that the bow of exile
shoots first. You are to know the bitter taste

of others' bread, how salt it is, and know
how hard a path it is for one who goes
descending and ascending others' stairs.

However, Cacciaguida also charges Dante to write and tell the world all that he has seen of Hell, Purgatory, and Heaven. Finally, Dante sees some other warriors of the Faith, such as Joshua, Judas Maccabeus, Charlemagne, Roland, and Godfrey of Bouillon (Canto XVIII).

=== Sixth Sphere (Jupiter: The Just Rulers) ===
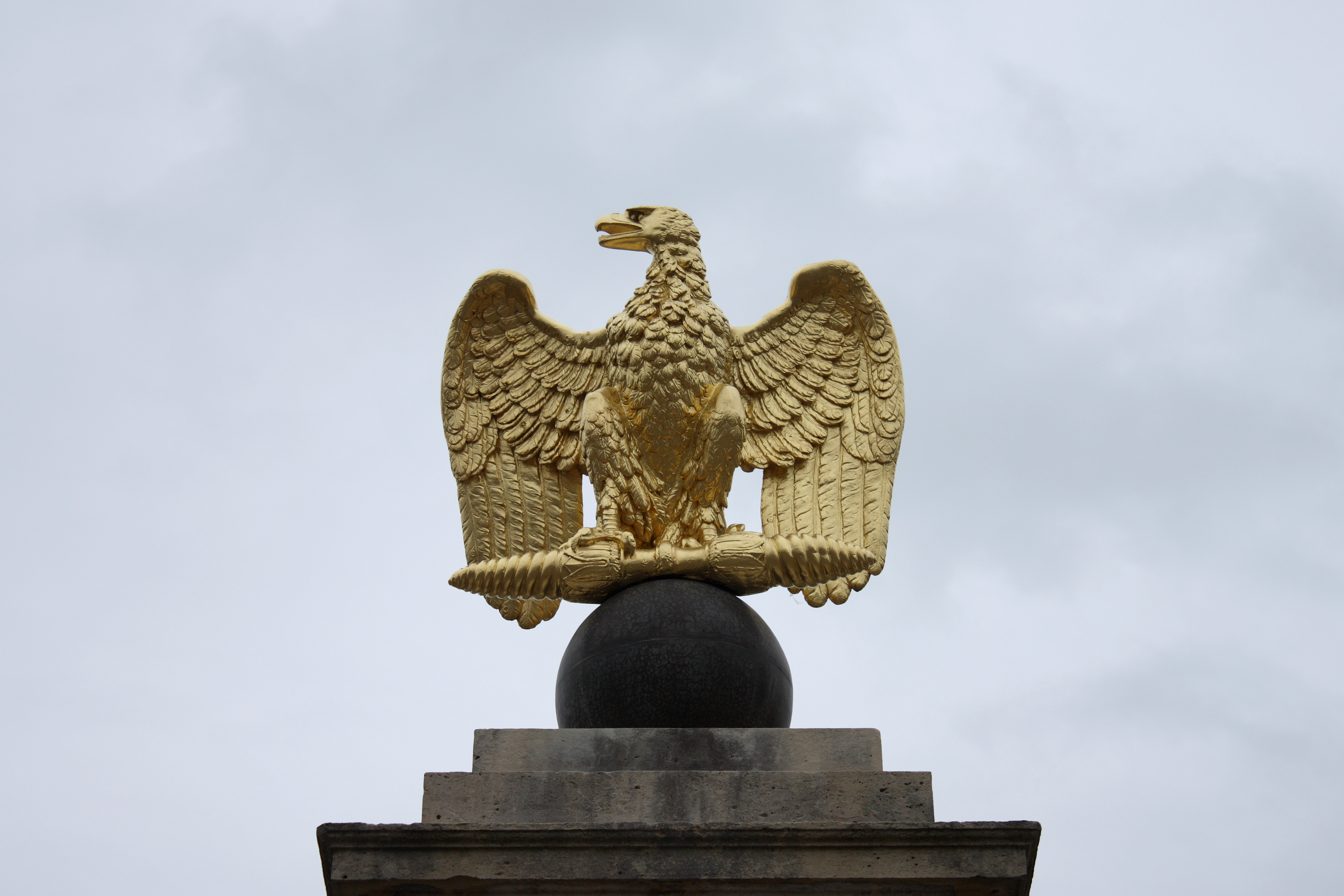
An imperial eagle. The souls forming the final "M" of "TERRAM" transform themselves into this shape, Canto 18.

The planet Jupiter is traditionally associated with the king of the gods, so Dante makes this planet the home of the rulers who displayed justice. The souls here spell out the Latin for "Love justice, ye that judge the earth" (the first sentence of the Book of Wisdom), after which the final "M" of that sentence is transformed into the shape of a giant imperial eagle (Canto XVIII):

DILIGITE IUSTITIAM were the verb
and noun that first appeared in that depiction;
QUI IUDICATIS TERRAM followed after.

Then, having formed the M of the fifth word,
those spirits kept their order; Jupiter's
silver, at that point, seemed embossed with gold.

Present in this sphere are David, Hezekiah, Constantine, and William II of Sicily, as well as two pagans: Trajan (converted to Christianity according to a medieval legend) and (to Dante's amazement) Ripheus the Trojan, who was saved by the mercy of God in an act of predestination. Trajan has appeared in the Divine Comedy before as an example of humility on the terrace of pride. On this terrace, Dante sees Trajan surrounded by his soldiers on their way to a military conquest, but Trajan halts after a grieving woman asks him to deliver justice to her son's murderers. The souls form the imperial eagle of divine justice, speaking with one voice of God's justice (Cantos XIX and XX). Dante uses this opportune moment in front of the eagle to ask about the accessibility of Heaven to people who were born before Christ or lived in an area where Christianity was not taught. Dante starts his question by positing such a person (Canto XIX):

A man is born on the banks
of the Indus, and no one is there to speak of
Christ to read or write of him,

and all his desires and acts are good, as far as
human reason can see, without sin in life or in
word.

He dies unbaptized and without our faith:
where is the justice that condemns him? where
is his fault if he does not believe?

Now who are you, who wish to sit on the bench
and judge from a thousand miles away, with sight
as short as handbreadth?

The only fault of this educated and knowledgeable man, born in the wrong place for knowledge of salvation, is his lack of faith and baptism. Shall he be denied Heaven? To answer Dante's question, the eagle says (Canto XIX):

To this kingdom no one
has ever risen who did not believe in Christ,
either before or after he was nailed to the wood.

At the very core of salvation is a belief that Jesus Christ is the Messiah. No matter whether a person was born before Christ or after, in Florence or by the Indus, he or she can believe that Christ would come or had come to save humanity. This is the small opening that allows for people like the man in Dante's example to ascend to Heaven.

=== Seventh Sphere (Saturn: The Contemplatives) ===
The sphere of Saturn is that of the contemplatives, who embody temperance. Dante here meets Peter Damian, and discusses with him monasticism, the doctrine of predestination, and the sad state of the Church. Dante also meets Saint Benedict, who laments the worldliness of his own monks (Cantos XXI and XXII). Beatrice, who represents theology, becomes increasingly lovely here, indicating the contemplative's closer insight into the truth of God:

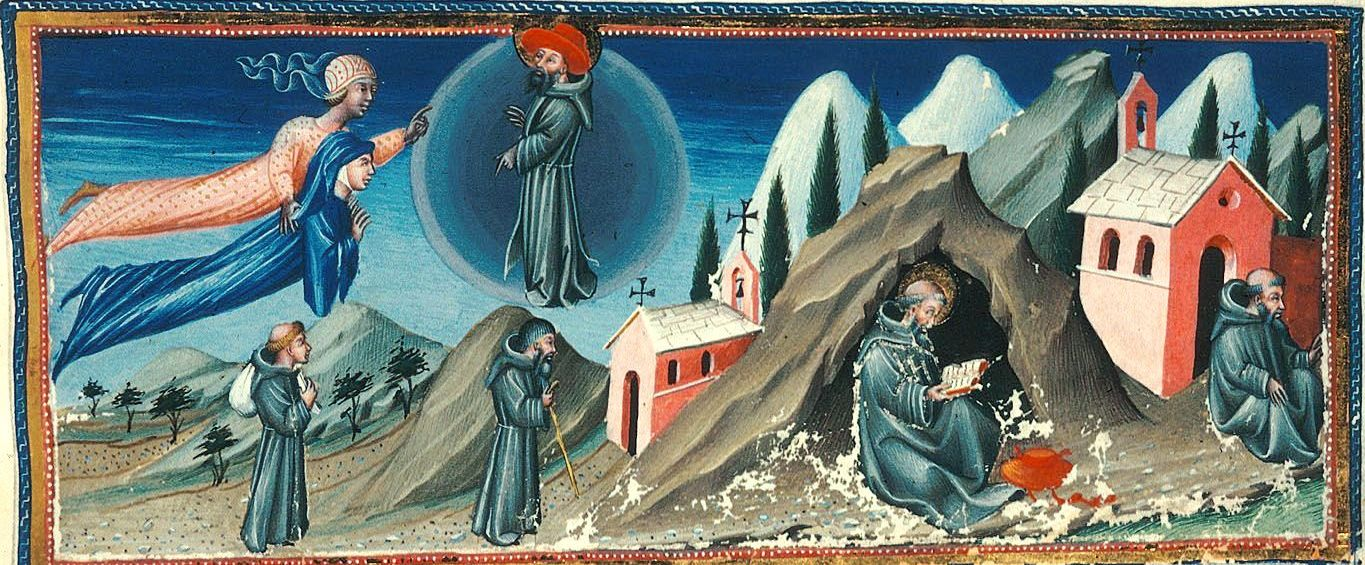
Dante and Beatrice meet Peter Damian, who tells of his life, and discusses predestination (miniature by Giovanni di Paolo), Canto 21.

She did not smile. Instead her speech to me
began: Were I to smile, then you would be
like Semele when she was turned to ashes,

because, as you have seen, my loveliness
which, even as we climb the steps of this
eternal palace, blazes with more brightness

were it not tempered here, would be so brilliant
that, as it flashed, your mortal faculty
would seem a branch a lightning bolt has cracked.

=== Eighth Sphere (The Fixed Stars: Faith, Hope, and Love) ===
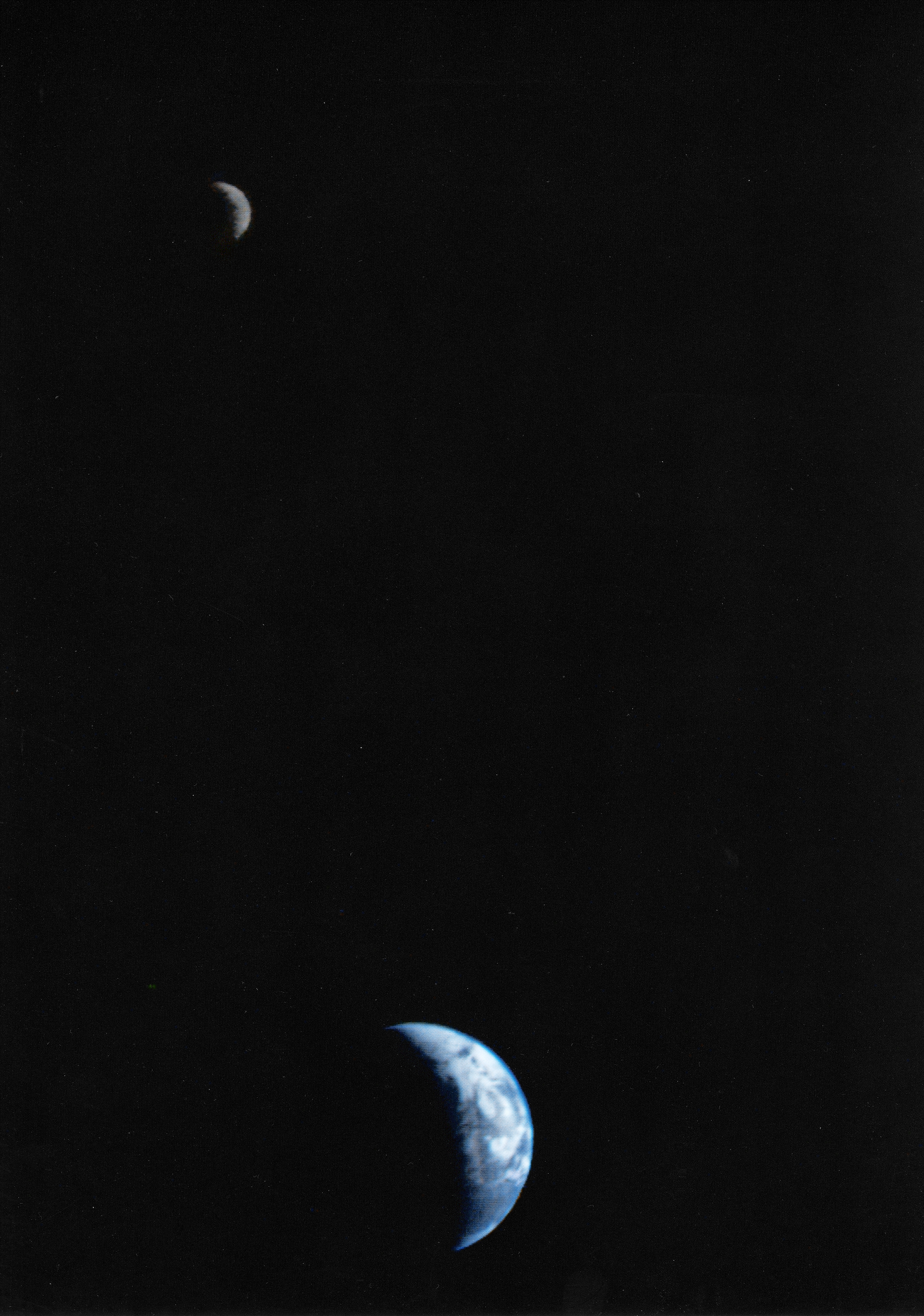
Looking down from the Sphere of the Fixed Stars, Dante sees the humble planet that is the Earth, Canto 22.

The sphere of the Fixed Stars is the sphere of the church triumphant. From here (in fact, from the constellation Gemini, under which he was born), Dante looks back on the seven spheres he has visited, and on the Earth (Canto XXII):

My eyes returned through all the seven spheres
and saw this globe in such a way that I
smiled at its scrawny image: I approve

that judgment as the best, which holds this earth
to be the least; and he whose thoughts are set
elsewhere, can truly be called virtuous.

Dante Alighieri`s Paradiso
Alessandro Sorrentino reads Canto XXXIII of Dante's Paradiso

Here, Dante sees the Virgin Mary and other saints (Canto XXIII). St. Peter tests Dante on faith, asking what it is, and whether Dante has it. In response to Dante's reply, St. Peter asks Dante how he knows that the Bible is true, and (in an argument attributed to Augustine) Dante cites the miracle of the Church's growth from such humble beginnings (Canto XXIV):

Say, who assures you that those works were real?
came the reply. The very thing that needs
proof no thing else attests these works to you.

I said: If without miracles the world
was turned to Christianity, that is
so great a miracle that, all the rest

are not its hundredth part: for you were poor
and hungry when you found the field and sowed
the good plant once a vine and now a thorn.

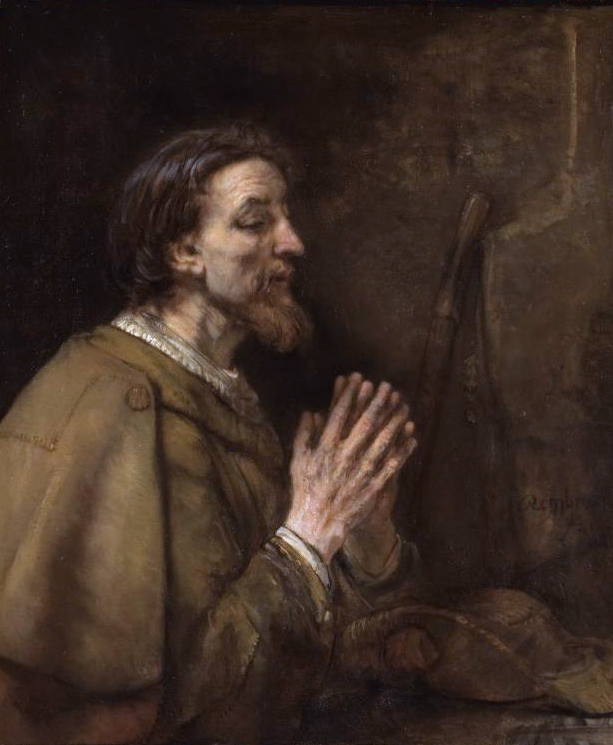
St. James, who questions Dante on hope (painting by Rembrandt), Canto 25.

St. James questions Dante on hope, and Beatrice vouches for his possession of it (Canto XXV):

There is no child of the Church Militant
who has more hope than he has, as is written
within the Sun whose rays reach all our ranks:

thus it is granted him to come from Egypt
into Jerusalem that he have vision
of it, before his term of warring ends.

Finally, St. John questions Dante on love. In his reply, Dante refers back to the concept of "twisted love" discussed in the Purgatorio (Canto XXVI):

Thus I began again: My charity
results from all those things whose bite can bring
the heart to turn to God; the world's existence

and mine, the death that He sustained that I
might live, and that which is the hope of all
believers, as it is my hope, together

with living knowledge I have spoken of
these drew me from the sea of twisted love
and set me on the shore of the right love.

The leaves enleaving all the garden of
the Everlasting Gardener, I love
according to the good He gave to them.

Dante also speaks with Adam (Canto XXVI).

St. Peter then denounces Pope Boniface VIII in very strong terms, and says that, in his eyes, the Papal See stands empty (Canto XXVII).

=== Ninth Sphere (The Primum Mobile: The Angels) ===
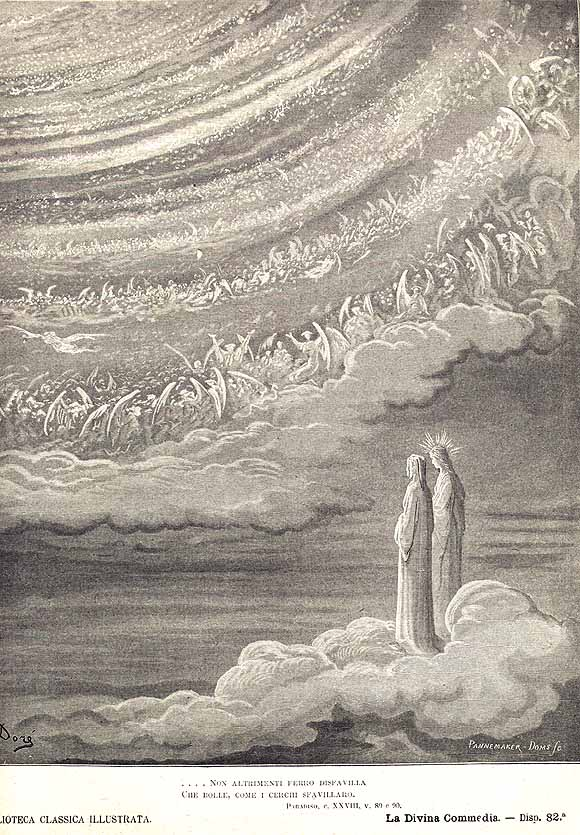
Dante and Beatrice see God as a point of light surrounded by angels (illustration by Gustave Doré), Canto 28.

The Primum Mobile ("first moved" sphere) is the last sphere of the physical universe. It is moved directly by God, and its motion causes all the spheres it encloses to move (Canto XXVII):

This heaven has no other where than this:
the mind of God, in which are kindled both
the love that turns it and the force it rains.

As in a circle, light and love enclose it,
as it surrounds the rest and that enclosing,
only He who encloses understands.

No other heaven measures this sphere's motion,
but it serves as the measure for the rest,
even as half and fifth determine ten;

The Primum Mobile is the abode of angels, and here Dante sees God as an intensely bright point of light surrounded by nine rings of angels (Canto XXVIII). Beatrice explains the creation of the universe, and the role of the angels, ending with a forceful criticism of the preachers of the day (Canto XXIX):

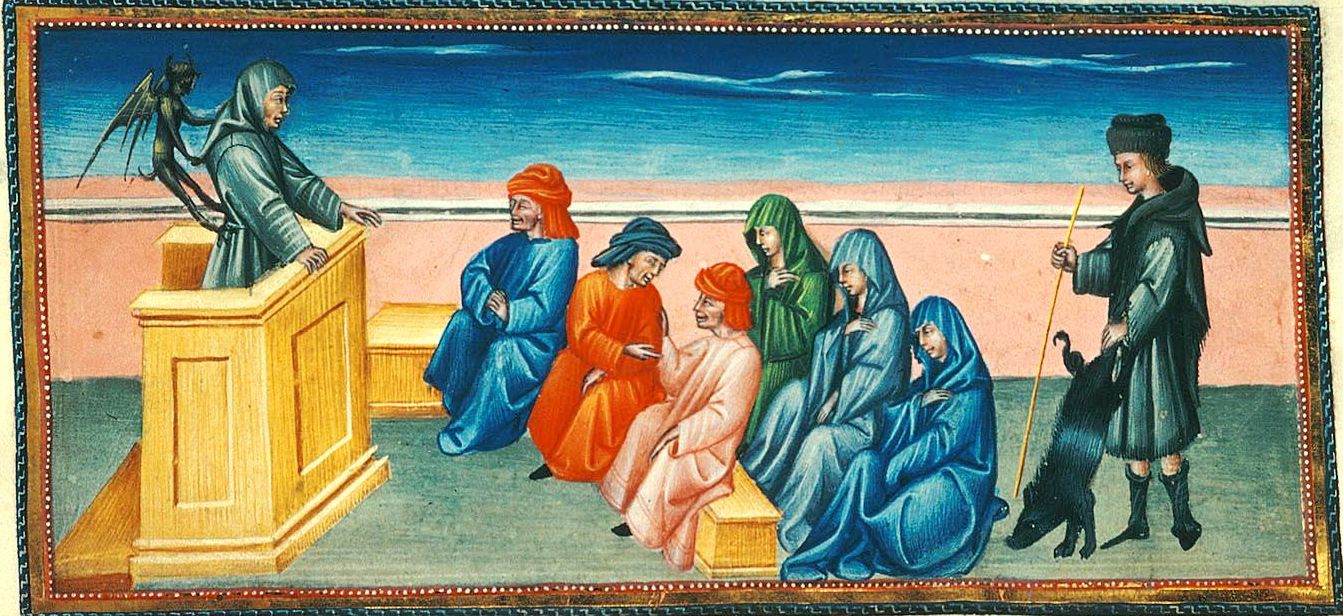
Beatrice criticises the preachers of the day, suggesting that a sinister "bird" (a winged demon) nests in the preacher's cowl (miniature by Giovanni di Paolo), Canto 29.

Christ did not say to his first company:
'Go, and preach idle stories to the world';
but he gave them the teaching that is truth,

and truth alone was sounded when they spoke;
and thus, to battle to enkindle faith,
the Gospels served them as both shield and lance.

But now men go to preach with jests and jeers,
and just as long as they can raise a laugh,
the cowl puffs up, and nothing more is asked.

But such a bird nests in that cowl, that if
the people saw it, they would recognize
as lies the pardons in which they confide.

== The Empyrean ==
From the Primum Mobile, Dante ascends to a region beyond physical existence, the Empyrean, which is the abode of God. Beatrice, representing theology, is here transformed to be more beautiful than ever before. Her beauty echoes the tradition of courtly lyric, which also pertains to her courtly role in the narrative that revolves around helping Dante and purifying him so he can ascend. Dante becomes enveloped in light, first blinding him and then rendering him fit to see God (Canto XXX).

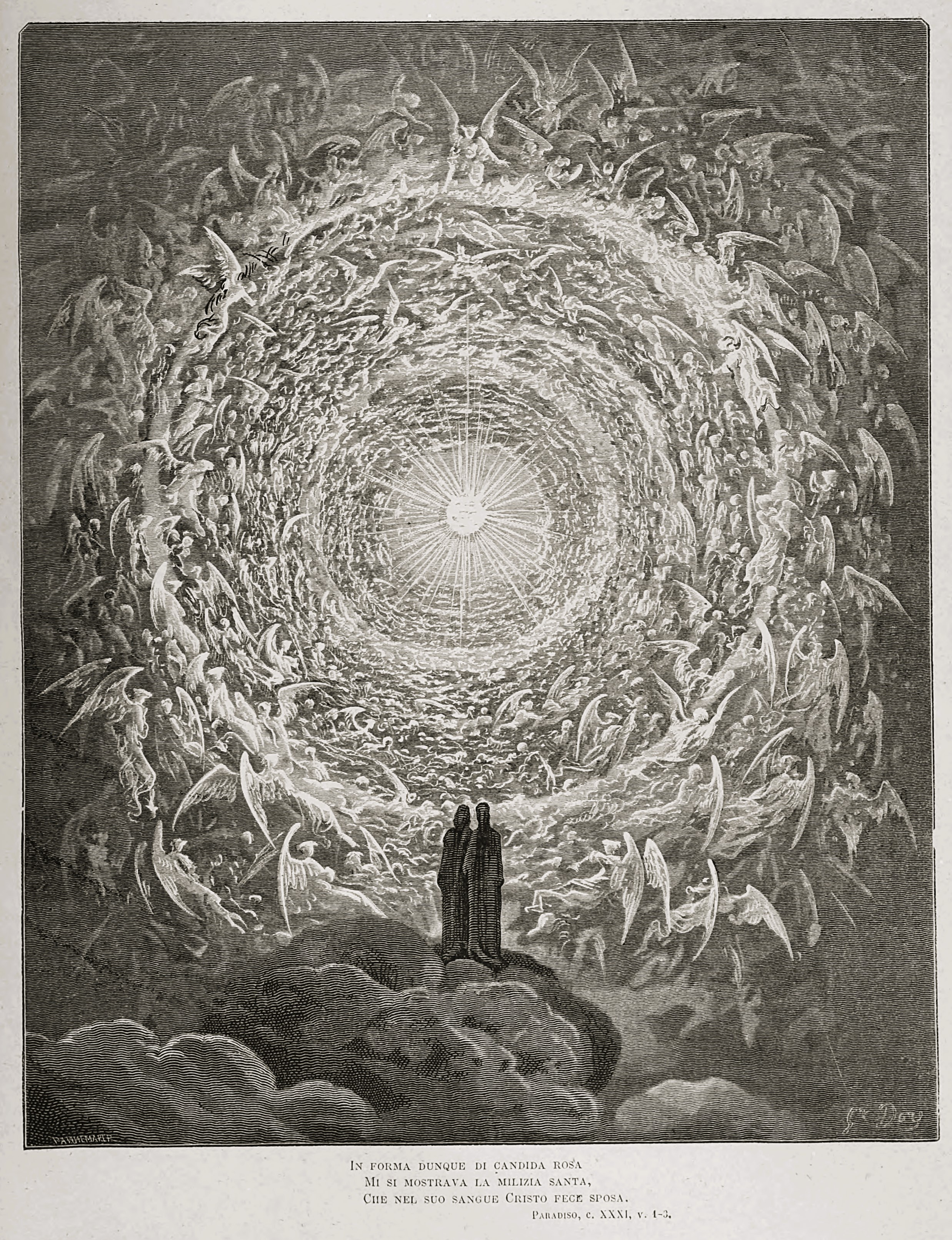
Dante and Beatrice before the celestial rose in the Empyrean (engraving by Gustave Doré), Canto 31.

Dante sees an enormous rose, symbolising divine love, the petals of which are the enthroned souls of the faithful (both those of the Old Testament and those of the New). All the souls he has met in Heaven, including Beatrice, have their home in this rose, and angels fly around the rose like bees, distributing peace and love. Beatrice now returns to her place in the rose, signifying that Dante has passed beyond theology in direct contemplation of God.

St. Bernard, as a mystical contemplative, now guides Dante further (Canto XXXI), describing the heavenly rose and its occupants. (St. Bernard may represent God, since he welcomes the pilgrim to the Empyrean, after which Dante is able to see God; in this reading, Beatrice would represent the Holy Spirit because she purifies Dante and brings him to St. Bernard and the Empyrean.) Ten women and eight men are pointed out to Dante in the Empyrean; the ladies appear in a hierarchy where Mary is the head and Eve is directly beneath her, followed by seven other Biblical women and Beatrice. The outnumbering of men by women recalls the beginning of the Inferno, in which many women appear in Limbo.

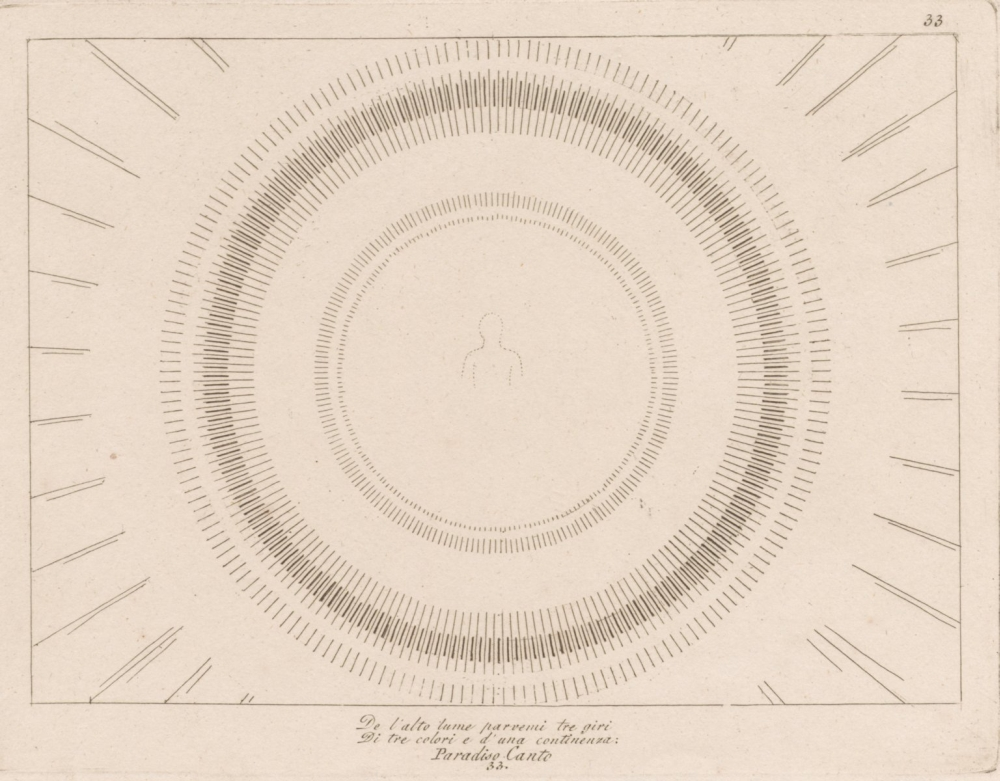
The three circles of the Trinity (illustration by John Flaxman), Canto 33.

St. Bernard further explains predestination and prays to the Virgin Mary on Dante's behalf. (The Empyrean as a whole abounds in Marian elements, such as the canto number 32's digits' adding up to five, which may represent Mary because of her five-letter name in Italian—Maria—and her experiences' having notably come in sets of five.) St. Bernard's prayer, which includes an anaphora using the informal second-person pronoun, draws from a history of similar prayers beginning as early as Greek eulogies. In late medieval Italy, poets such as Jacopone da Todi wrote praises of Mary called laude, and Dante's prayer to the Virgin takes inspiration from this tradition and condenses its form, focusing first on Mary's role on Earth and then her role in Heaven and her motherly qualities.

Finally, Dante comes face to face with God (Cantos XXXII and XXXIII). God appears as three equally large circles occupying the same space, representing the Father, the Son, and the Holy Spirit. Within these circles Dante can discern the human form of Christ. The Divine Comedy ends with Dante trying to understand how the circles fit together, and how the humanity of Christ relates to the divinity of the Son but, as Dante puts it, "that was not a flight for my wings". In a flash of understanding, which he cannot express, Dante does finally see this, and his soul becomes aligned with God's love.

But already my desire and my will
were being turned like a wheel, all at one speed,
by the Love which moves the sun and the other stars.

== See also ==
- Divine Comedy
- Inferno
- Purgatorio
- Theological virtues
- Allegory in the Middle Ages
- Dante Alighieri and the Divine Comedy in popular culture
- List of cultural references in the Divine Comedy
