= Cacciaguida =

Italian crusader

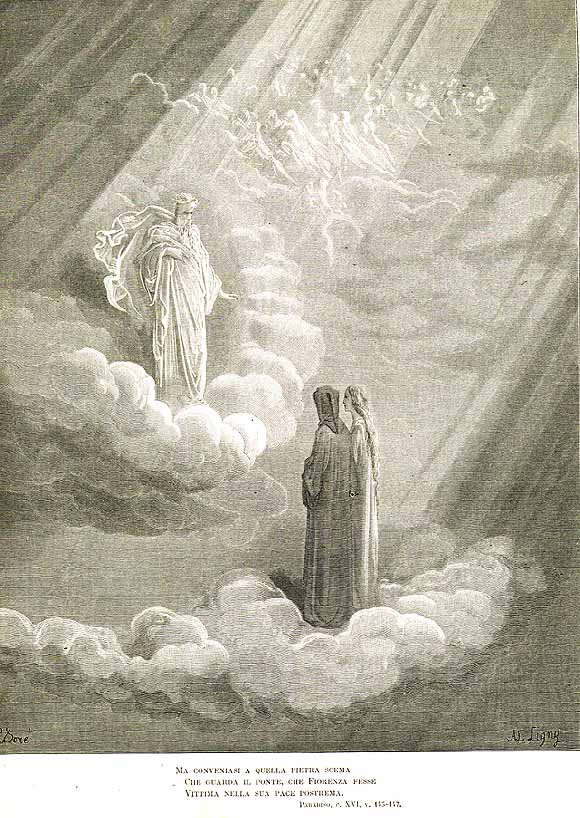
Cacciaguida, illustration by Gustave Doré

Cacciaguida degli Elisei (Italian: [kattʃaˈɡwiːda deʎʎ eliˈzɛi]; c. 1098 – c. 1148) was an Italian crusader and the great-great-grandfather of Dante Alighieri.

Little is known about his life. He was born in Florence, and two documents from 1189 and 1201 mention his existence. The 1189 document lists his sons as Preitenetto and Alighiero, the latter being Dante's great-grandfather, and the source of his surname.

All other details of his biography are those from his most famous descendant's works. Dante recounts that Cacciaguida joined the Second Crusade and was there knighted by Emperor Conrad III before dying in the Holy Land.

Dante meets Cacciaguida in Paradiso, precisely in the canti XV–XVII. Cacciaguida is the only ancestor of Dante he encounters (although Alighiero is mentioned as remaining in the first level of Purgatory), and the elder serves as a father figure to the poet, and a parallel to Virgil's Aeneas meeting with his own father Anchises. As Dante addressed him:

«Voi siete il padre mio;
voi mi date a parlar tutta baldezza;
voi mi levate sì, ch'i' son più ch'io.
Per tanti rivi s'empie d'allegrezza
la mente mia, che di sé fa letizia
perché può sostener che non si spezza..»

"You are my ancestor,
You give to me all hardihood to speak,
You lift me so that I am more than I.
So many rivulets with gladness fill
My mind, that of itself it makes a joy
Because it can endure this and not burst."

Paradiso, Canto XVI, 16–21 (Longfellow trans.)
