= Jofrancus Offusius =

German astrologer (c.1505–c.1570)

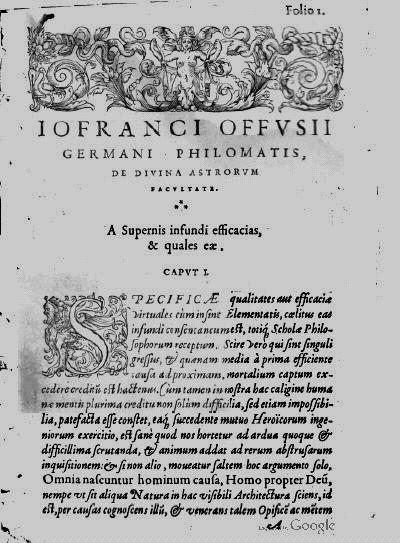
First page of De Divina Facultate Astrorum

Jofrancus Offusius (also Ioannes or Johannes Francus Offusius) (c. 1505 – c. 1570), was a German astronomer-astrologer and scholar. Historians of science have become interested in Offusius since he has been identified as the author of a set of annotations appearing on various exemplars of Nicolaus Copernicus's book De Revolutionibus.

He published in Paris a book De divina facultate astrorum in larvatam astrologiam (in 1570). His work is mentioned by Tycho Brache, Kepler and Gerolamo Cardano. His use of Platonic solids to explain features of the Solar System has also been of modest interest for historical research.

Very little is known about Offusius himself. It has been conjectured that he came from Oberhausen in Westphalia. He does not seem to have been affiliated to a University or attached to a princely court and he seems to have wandered across Europe. He presents himself as "German philomath" and shows little respect for established professors (calling them in a preface "asses and sycophants"). John Dee recalls meeting "Offhuysius" sometime in 1552 in Paris where a group of students apparently had formed around him. Pontus de Tyard met "Jofranc Offusien" a few years later, around 1556, in Dieppe. Offusius claimed to have conducted thousands of astronomical observations and published a book of ephemerides for 1557. De Divina facultate presented an astrological system where the distances to planets are connected with Plato's solids. He mentions two other books of his in his known writings.

== Works ==
- Ephemeridis anni salutis humanae 1557 ex recenti theoria eiusque tabulis supputatae
- De divina facultate astrorum in larvatam astrologiam, Typographia Johannis Royerii (Paris) 1570 {Googlebooks}

== See also ==
- Sphere of fire
