= Sphere of fire =

In geocentric cosmological models, a realm between earth and moon

Spheres of the four elements around Earth. In order, from outside to inside; fire, air, (presumably water) and earth.

Sphere of fire is the name given in Ptolemaic astronomy to the sphere intervening between, and separating, the Earth and the Moon.

== Traditional concept ==
Building on Empedocles's vision of the world as a four-level cake of stacked fundamental elements - earth, water, air and fire - with fire at the top, Aristotle saw the sublunary world as surmounted by the sphere of fire. Aristotle's conception became prevalent in the Hellenic world, and was given a distance scale by Ptolemy: “taking the radius of the spherical surface of the Earth and the water as the unit, the radius of the spherical sphere which surrounds the air and fire is 33, the radius of the lunar sphere is 64....”.

The Middle Ages broadly inherited the concept of the four elements of earth, water, air and fire arranged in concentric spheres about the earth as centre: as the purest of the four elements, fire - and the sphere of fire - stood highest in the ascending sequence of the scala naturae, and closest to the superlunary world of the aether. Dante and Beatrice in The Divine Comedy ascended through the sphere of fire to reach the Moon, while three centuries later Benvenuto Cellini claimed in his autobiography to have bellowed so loud as to reach the sphere of fire.

The contemporary astronomer Jofrancus Offusius estimated the distance to the sphere of fire from the earth in terms of multiples of the earth's diameter, and believed that comets emanated from the space between the sphere of fire and the moon.

== New philosophy ==
The rise of heliocentrism had by the early seventeenth century destroyed the very foundations for the concept of the sphere of fire. John Donne lamented in 1611 that "The new philosophy calls all in doubt,/The element of fire is quite put out".

Nevertheless, Paracelsians like Robert Fludd continued as late as 1617 to present a picture of a geocentric cosmos, with the Elementum ignis still nestling immediately below the Sphera Lunae.

== See also ==
- Aristarchus of Samos
- Celestial spheres
- Firmament
- Ionosphere
- Nicholas of Cusa
- Pliny the Elder
- Sublunary sphere
