= Empyrean =

Highest heaven in ancient cosmologies

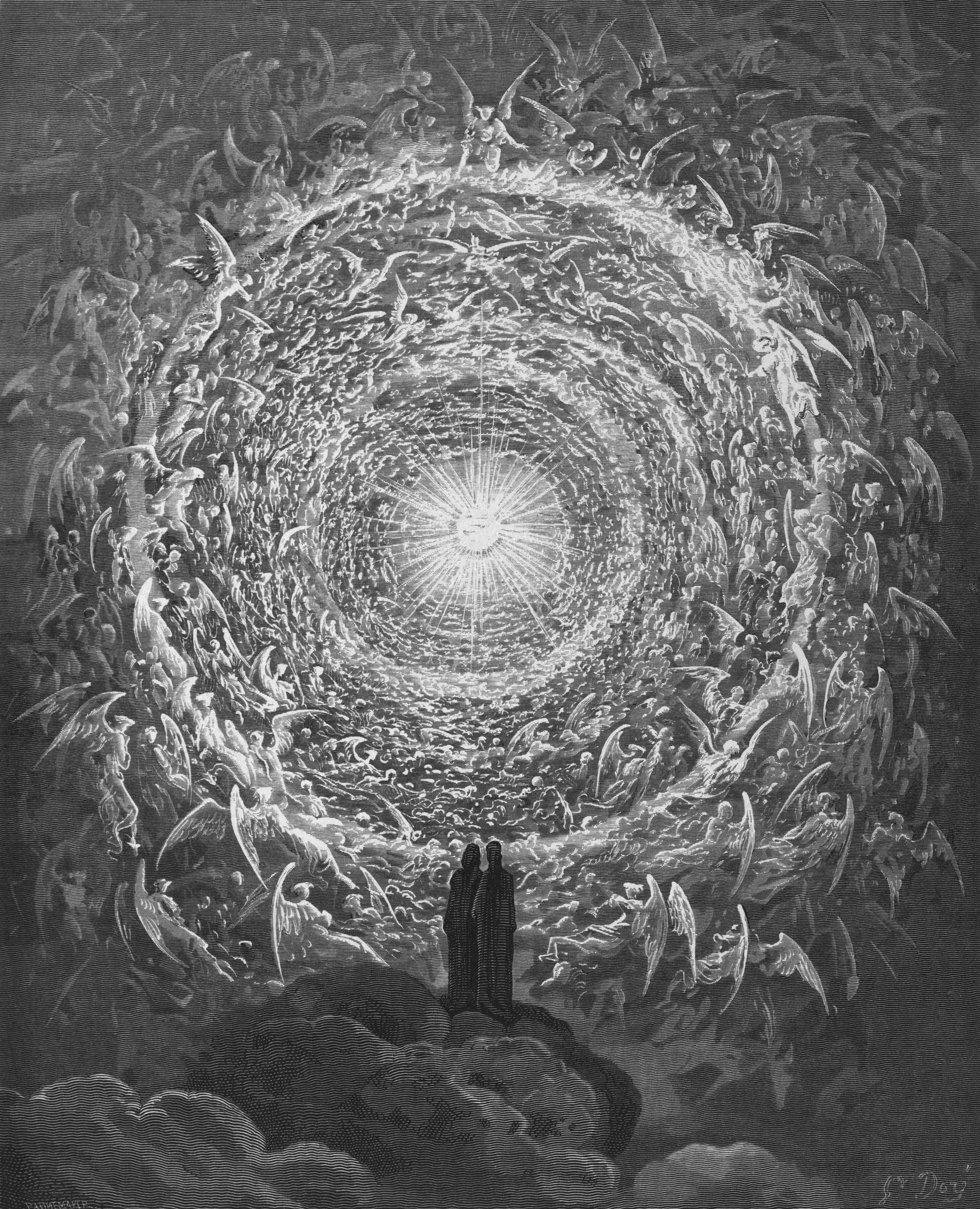
The Divine Comedy's Empyrean, illustrated by Gustave Doré

In ancient European cosmologies inspired by Aristotle, the Empyrean heaven, Empyreal or simply the Empyrean, was the place in the highest heaven which was supposed to be occupied by the element of fire (or aether in Aristotle's natural philosophy). Later early and medieval Christian cosmology incorporated the concept in descriptions of the Christian notion of heaven.

== Etymology ==
The word derives from the Medieval Latin empyreus, an adaptation of the Ancient Greek empyros (ἔμπυρος), meaning "in or on the fire (pyr)".

The word is used both as a noun and as an adjective, but empyreal is an alternate adjective form. The scientific words empyreuma and empyreumatic, applied to the characteristic smell of the burning or charring of vegetable or animal matter, have the same Greek origin.

== In Christianity ==
Early Christians took inspiration from Aristotle's cosmology in their reckoning of heaven. From the 7th century onwards, the idea of the Empyrean gained traction in the faith because of writers like Isidore of Seville and Bede.

In later Christian religious cosmologies, the Empyrean was "the source of light" and where God and saved souls resided. In medieval Christianity, the Empyrean was the third heaven and beyond "the heaven of the air and the heaven of the stars." The Empyrean was thus used as a name for the incorporeal "heaven of the first day".

In Christian literature, the Empyrean was described as the dwelling-place of God, the blessed, celestial beings so divine they are made of pure light, and the source of light and creation. Notably, at the very end of Dante's Paradiso, Dante visits God in the Empyrean.

== See also ==
- Atziluth
- Central Fire
- Heaven
- Hyperuranion
- Paradise
- Pleroma
- Seven Heavens
- Third Heaven
- Firmament
