= Giovanna da Montefeltro =

Thirteenth-century Italian noblewoman

Giovanna da Montefeltro was a thirteenth-century Italian noblewoman and the wife of Bonconte da Montefeltro. She is referenced by Dante Alighieri in his Divine Comedy for not remembering her late husband in her prayers.

== Life ==
Giovanna's family lineage is unknown. Giovanna married Bonconte I da Montefeltro, the son of Guido I da Montefeltro. She and Bonconte had one daughter called Manentissa, who married Guido Salvatico of the conti Guidi, Count of Dovadola. Giovanna became a widow after Bonconte died in the Battle of Campaldino in 1289. Little else is known of her life, except for the information provided by Dante in the Divine Comedy.

== In the Divine Comedy ==
Giovanna is referenced in Canto V of Purgatorio, the second canticle of Dante's Divine Comedy. When Dante is approached by Bonconte da Montefeltro, Bonconte bemoans how he believes that his wife, Giovanna, and other relatives were not praying for him in his afterlife. That his family members have no concern for him unlike Jacopo del Cassero, another character met by Dante in the same canto, who begs Dante for aid.

For Bonconte, who repented for his sins by praying for the Virgin Mary in articulo mortis, the prayers of loving relatives are necessary to allow him to spend a shorter time purging from his vices in the Mountain of Purgatory. According to Dante, by having forgotten him, Giovanna is therefore not performing her duty as a wife and a widow. Bonconte's harsh condemnation of Giovanna is the first instance of Dante's reflection on the politics of widowhood and the social responsibilities of widows in medieval society. Similarly to Bonconte, other characters, such as Nino Visconti, lament the fact that their wives forgot about them after their death and no longer remember them and pray for their souls. In contrast, other characters praise their wives, such as Forese Donati, whose wife, Nella has constantly prayed for him and therefore allowed for him to complete his time in Purgatory in a shorter time.
