= Bonconte da Montefeltro (died 1289) =

Italian general (1250–1289)

Coat of arms of the Montefeltro family

Bonconte da Montefeltro (died 11 June 1289) was an Italian Ghibelline general. He led Ghibelline forces in several engagements until his battlefield death. Dante Alighieri featured Montefeltro as a character in the Divine Comedy.

== Life ==
Bonconte was born in the 1250s to the Ghibelline leader Guido I da Montefeltro and Manentessa, the daughter of Guido, count of Giaggiolo. He had a wife, Giovanna, and a daughter, Manentissa. Bonconte helped remove the Guelphs from Arezzo in June 1287 with the Ghibellines and in 1288 he was in command of the Aretines. While in command of the Aretines, Bonconte defeated the Guelphs of Siena at the Battle of Pieve al Toppo. In 1289, Bonconte became the captain of the Aretines when he led them into battle with, and were defeated by, the Guelphs of Florence. The Aretines were ultimately defeated by the Guelphs of Florence in the Battle of Campaldino and that was where, in 1289, Bonconte was killed. Bonconte's body was never found at the battleground of Campaldino.

Prior to the battle, Bonconte advised the Aretines not to engage in open battle with the Florentines. He was sent by the Bishop of Arezzo find the enemy position before the battle with Guelphs of Florence. Bonconte returned and told the bishop that it would not be wise to go into battle with the Guelphs, to which the Bishop reportedly responded by saying that Bonconte was undeserving of his family name. The bishop sent the forces into battle where both he and Bonconte died.

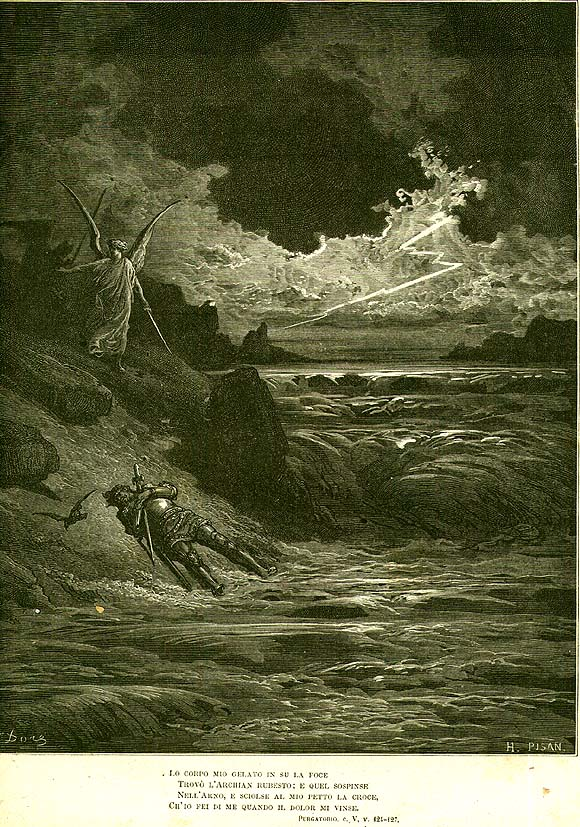
The death of Bonconte in Purgatorio 5 depicted by French illustrator Gustave Doré

== In the Divine Comedy ==
Bonconte da Montefeltro appears in the Canto V of Purgatorio, the second canticle of Dante Alighieri's Divine Comedy. Here, he appears in the midst of souls speaking to Dante. Bonconte bemoans that his wife, Giovanna da Montefeltro, and other relatives (by whom he most likely means his daughter, who was married to a member of the Conti Guidi family, or his brother Federico, who would be later killed in Urbino in 1322) were not remembering him in their prayers. This view and Montefeltro's lack of hope greatly differs from the other characters Dante meets in this canto, Jacopo del Cassero and Pia de' Tolomei, who petition Dante for his aid.

After Bonconte reveals his name, Dante questions him as to why his body was never found. Bonconte replies that after being harmed at the throat, he fled. Bonconte found himself where the Archiano, a torrent near Arezzo, and the River Arno meet, and there he died calling to the Virgin Mary as a saving grace. Then, while an angel of God took his soul, the devil, angered that he did not get Bonconte's soul at the last moment, destroyed Bonconte's body out of anger, which created a storm that swept Bonconte's body to the bottom of the Arno. Dante was actually present at the Battle of Campaldino as a cavalryman, which he considered a great victory for the Guelphs.

The conflict over Bonconte's soul replicates the conflict between Francis of Assisi and a fallen cherub over the soul of Guido da Montefeltro, Buonconte's father, in Inferno, Canto XXVII. However, in this case, the angel wins Bonconte's soul for heaven, while in Guido's case, the devil won. By creating such opposed outcomes for Bonconte and Guido, Dante showcases that the irony in having a man who arranged for salvation and repentance in his old age (Guido) being cast to hell, while another who had sincere repentance at the very end of his life (Bonconte) is able to go to Purgatory.

== See also ==
- Palinurus, Virgilian character whose body is lost
