= Nella Donati =

Medieval noblewoman from Florence, Italy

Nella Donati (possibly also known as Giovanna or Giovannella) was a Florentine noblewoman. She is primarily known because of Dante Alighieri's treatment of her relationship to her husband, Forese Donati, in the Divine Comedy and in a series of poems Dante exchanged with Forese.

== Biography ==
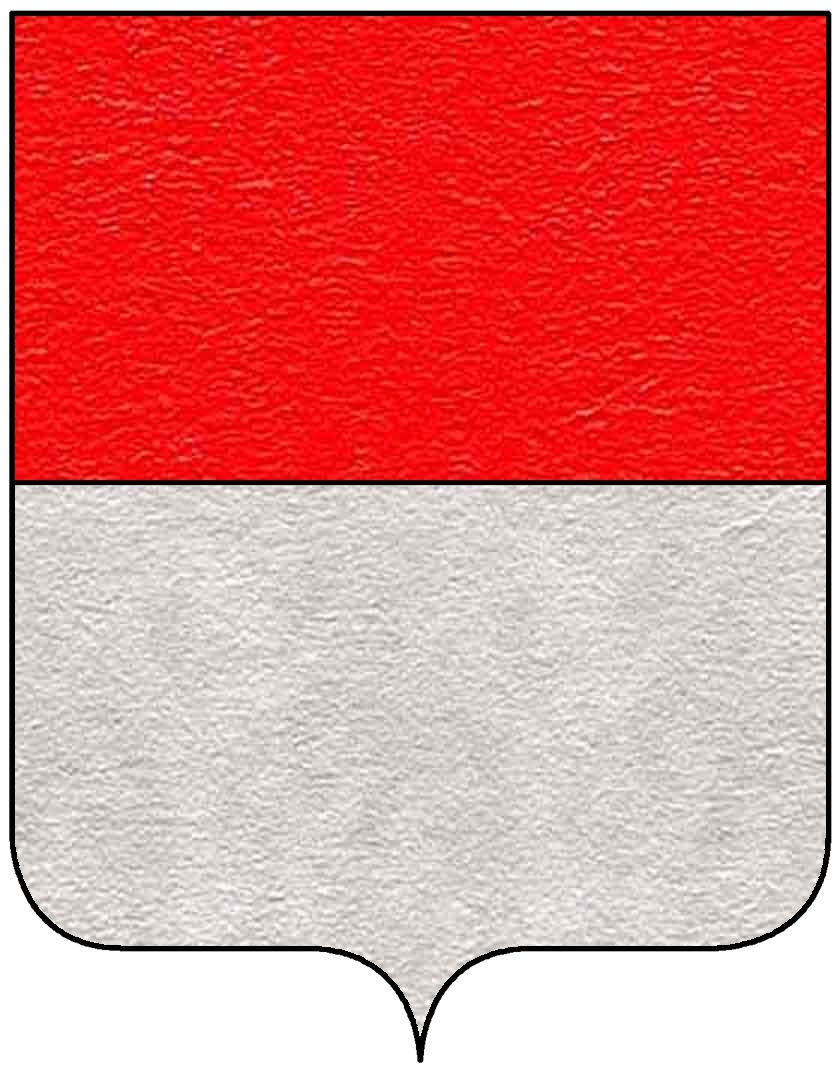
Donati family coat of arms

Nella is associated with the Frescobaldi family. She was married to Forese Donati and they had one daughter named Ghita. In 1296, Forese died in Florence, and Nella became a widow. She has been described to be young at Forese's death. She is not known to have remarried. Nella is also associated with the Ghibellines, according to Dante's writings.

== In the works of Dante Alighieri ==
=== Dante's Tenzone with Forese ===
A key to understanding the literary reception of Nella Donati is through Dante's tenzone with Forese. This tenzone is composed of sonnets that Dante used to comment on Forese. In this tenzone, Dante uses a negative tone to address Forese and Nella. Interpretations focus on the importance of the fact that most of his tenzone poems were written in Florence, which emphasizes how much he connects Nella and her husband to the city. Dante describes Nella by her unattractive and loud cough. He represents her as a cold and harsh woman, no matter the weather. He insults Nella but attributes her poor behavior to Forese's effects on her.

=== Interpretations of Nella in Dante's Tenzone with Forese ===
The underlying message in his tenzone is that Forese's sexual inadequacies have left Nella lonely and frigid. According to Dante, Forese cannot sexually please Nella or provide her more than one child. Not only does Forese have trouble properly satisfying his wife, but Dante also critiques him for his self-serving economic motives. His gluttony furthers Nella's critical appearance here as she cannot afford proper care for herself, so she is prone to sickness. Dante hints at this by mentioning her insufficient bedsheets (copertoio in Italian). Her agonizing cough is a product of their lacking sex life as well as the money that Forese has wasted.

Dante also uses Nella to emphasize Forese's immoral bloodline. One line includes an exclamation from Nella's mother in which she laments the disgust she has for Forese. Here we find that Forese not only squandered his own money but that he has also spent all of Nella's dowry. In Dante's sonnet, Nella's mother is upset at his rash behavior and exclaims that Nella could have been married off to a rivaling political faction. According to her mother, Nella almost married a member of the Guidi family, an ancient and prominent Florentine clan, which her family turned down for Forese. Her regret relays to Dante's audience how despicably Forese handles his money and uses it to shame his class status. Dante even mentions that the Donati family was so notorious for stealing money that Florentines feared using money around them. This heavy emphasis on Nella's unfulfilling marriage highlights that Forese's title is deteriorating further.

The tenzone is acknowledged to paint a picture of an ever-cold wife who is both luckless and possibly unfaithful. Some interpret the description of bedsheets as an accusation of Nella being an adulteress. Dante also points out her Ghibelline ties and makes this yet another point for Forese to distrust her. However, interpretations do not see these comments as attacks on Nella, instead, they are seen as indirect critiques of Forese.

Some interpretations draw from the similarities of Dante's opinion on Nella and his overarching view of Florence. To Dante, both are neglected female entities who fall to the greed of others. In this evaluation, Dante uses Nella to expand his commentary on Florence at the time of upheaval. The tenzone itself is seen as a masculine charged attempt for superiority over Florence, in which Dante uses Nella to insult Forese's authority on the subject.

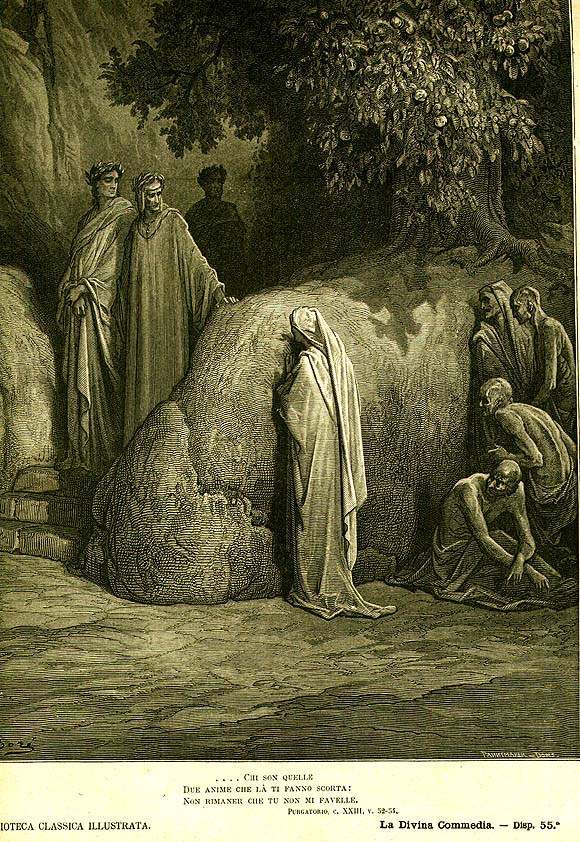
Dante's encounter with Forese in Purgatorio 23, by Gustave Doré.

=== The Divine Comedy ===
Nella appears in a conversation between Dante and Forese Donati in Canto 23 of Purgatorio in Dante Alighieri's Divine Comedy. She is mentioned after Dante learns that his gluttonous friend Forese has somehow advanced very far in Purgatory. Dante is surprised at this and asks how he could be so high up in Purgatory, as he has only recently died. Forese explains to him that he was only able to get so far because of his righteous wife, Nella. Here we learn that she has been weeping and praying for Forese, and that these good works helped him move through Purgatory much more quickly than he could have alone. Since she has kept his name alive on earth, and prayed to God for him so often, he has spent less than four years in the lower levels of Purgatory. Now he is at the Terrace of Gluttony.

=== Interpretations of Nella in the Divine Comedy ===
In contrast to her depiction in tenzone, Dante portrays Nella in a much different manner in Purgatorio. In Purgatorio, Nella's prayers accentuate her extreme level of devotion to God. She is the perfect representation of the widow that Dante imagines God desires, in her pure devotion to Him. Dante also underlines the importance of her not remarrying after becoming a widow. She is not the defiant woman seen in tenzone, but instead a righteous woman of God, helping her husband reach salvation. Nella becomes a go-between with God through her prayers. She is the opposite of the distrustful wife who was represented in the tenzone. Dante no longer believes Forese should be suspicious of her but that he should respect her. Nella is often compared to Forese's sister, Piccarda Donati, because Dante represents them both as good and virtuous women. In fact, Piccarda is so virtuous that she is explained to be in Heaven, which emphasizes the extent to which Nella is complimented throughout Dante and Forese's conversation.

In their relationship to each other, Forese and Nella symbolize a couple with true love for each other. Forese speaks sweetly of her and exclaims that he has always loved her. He spends much of the canto praising Nella for her goodness and underscoring his love for her. Their reciprocity as a couple is shown in how Nella makes sure he is never forgotten on earth, through her prayers. Nella and Forese show the example of what marriages under God should be, according to Dante. Nella is a perfect widow to Forese: she cries for him, prays and is utterly devoted to him even after his death. Unlike the standards of the time, Nella does not follow the path of other widows in her culture, she doesn't remarry and become unfaithful. Dante views this as the ideal behavior for widows, and Forese applauds Nella for her exemplary conduct as a wife. He explicitly says that she is someone special and deserving of God's love, which she in turn receives for her good deeds.

Several interpreters see Dante's evolving opinion on Nella as an apology of sorts. They see his kindness toward Nella in Purgatorio as a way for him to make up for his negative view of her in his tenzone. They also explain that it is not likely that Forese himself had such a change in heart, but rather Dante's perspective that changed. This depiction of her is often understood as Dante being forgiving, not Forese being overly affectionate to Nella.

Nella is also used as a mode for Dante to critique the morality of Florentine women. In Purgatorio, Dante and Forese reference the women they know in Florence in negative terms. They shun the women for showing their bodies off with little care for social standards. Forese also shares a prophecy in which he tells Dante that these women will face punishment for their promiscuity. This is seen as a glimpse into the medieval values of the time: particularly that of open feminine sexuality. Since Dante includes these women in the same instance that he mentions Nella, he associates the Florentine women with heightened immorality in comparison to Nella's perfected behavior. While Dante and Forese discuss that both the humans on earth and God above disapproves of the "more sexual" women in Florence, they treat Nella with admiration. Sara Díaz writes that when Dante contrasts her to the women in Florence, the lack of appreciation these women show to God is evident. Diaz also sees the way Dante speaks of these women as being misogyny toward both these women and Nella.

== In other works ==
Some commentaries find that Dante's focus on Nella in Purgatorio and the tenzone with Forese has been incorporated into later works by influential poets and authors.

=== In Giovanni Boccaccio's Decameron ===
Fourteenth-century Italian author Giovanni Boccaccio seems to have incorporated Dante's treatment of Nella Donati in the Decameron. In one of the Decameron's tales, Boccaccio features a marriage relationship that bears strong similarities with Forese and Nella's relationship as depicted by Dante in his tenzone with Forese. In the seventh tale of the Tenth Day of the Decameron, Mazzeo's wife is sexually unhappy. She is described as being "cold" and empty due to her husband's incompetence. Dante scholar Fabian Alfie focuses on the similarities between Dante's depiction of Nella in his tenzone, and the adulterous woman in the Decameron. He believes that Boccaccio drew from the description of Forese and Nella in Dante's tenzone to blame the Mazzeo for his inabilities as a husband. Rather than leave the "coldness" up to interpretation, like Dante does, Boccaccio explicitly attributes it to Mazzeo's inadequacies. Mazzeo's wife is not punished for their failed marriage. Boccaccio often quotes Dante throughout his writing, sometimes to disagree with Dante's conclusions about politics or cultural standards.

Boccaccio also borrows from Dante's poetry in the eighth tale of the Seventh Day. In this story, a gentlewoman named Sismonda cheats on her merchant husband, Arriguccio. She almost ends up caught, but then successfully hides her infidelity from her family. Her mother, upset that her daughter was accused of cheating on Arriguccio, criticizes her sons for treating Sismonda so. She further attacks Arriguccio for his status and downgrades him by comparing his attitude to that of a peasant. Sismonda's mother's attack on Arriguccio mirrors Nella's mother's comments in the tenzone. Alfie finds this a copy of Dante's words but with a focus on class differences, rather than on political issues. He believes that by using Dante's work as a basis, Boccaccio expands on his feelings against the merchant class. According to relevant commentary, by not reprimanding Sismonda for her bad behavior, Boccaccio's writing is connected to Dante's depiction of Nella in Purgatorio 23. Both are not blamed for their issues but are instead used to point out their husbands' incompetence socially, politically, and sexually.

=== In Machiavelli's Mandragola ===
Fabian Alfie also compares Nella to characters in Machiavelli's works. He sees Machiavelli as rooting his play Mandragola on the commentary Boccaccio makes in the Decameron. Machiavelli's character Callimaco makes similar descriptions of a woman's coldness that both Boccaccio and Dante utilize. Although Alfie believes that Machiavelli was more directly influenced by Boccaccio, he still concludes that this style of description originated in Dante's tenzone.
