= Guglielmino =

Guglielmino may refer to:

- Guglielmino degli Ubertini (circa 1219 – 1289), Italian condottiero and bishop of Arezzo
- Edward Guglielmino, Australian musician, disc jockey, public speaker, academic, and blogger
