= Sestini =

Sestini is a surname. Notable people with the surname include:

- Andrea Sestini Hlaváčková (born 1986), Czech tennis player
- Bartolomeo Sestini (1792-1822), Italian poet
- Benedict Sestini (1816–1890), astronomer, mathematician and architect
- Giovanna Sestini (1749–1814), Italian operatic soprano
- Aldo Sestini, Italian geographer
- Giuliano Sestini (1931–1996), Italian Geologist
