= Pia de' Tolomei =

Italian noblewoman from Siena

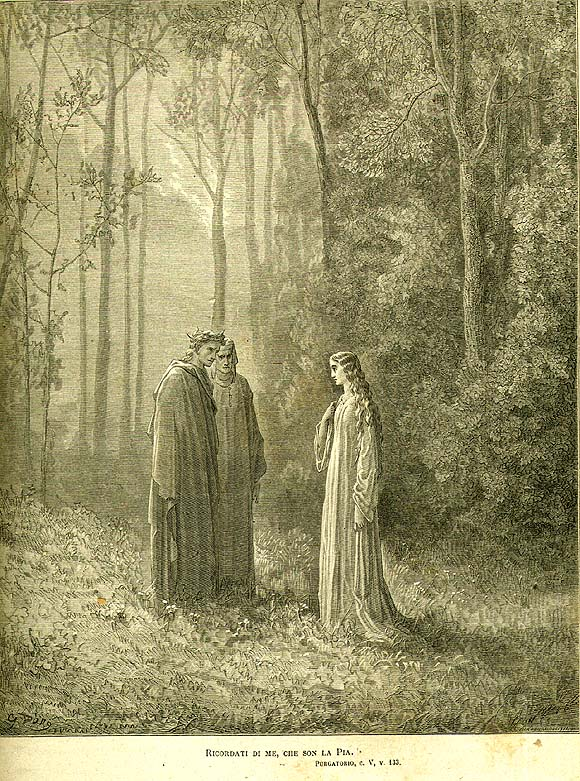
Dante, Virgil and Pia de' Tolomei by Gustave Doré.

Pia de' Tolomei was an Italian noblewoman from Siena identified as "la Pia," a minor character in Dante's Divine Comedy who was murdered by her husband without seeking absolution. Her brief presence in the poem has inspired many works in art, music, literature, and cinema. Her character in the Divine Comedy is noted for her compassion and serves a greater program among the characters in her canto, as well as the female characters in the entire poem.

== In the Divine Comedy ==
=== La Pia ===
According to a tradition recorded by early commentators of the Divine Comedy, Pia de' Tolomei is identified as "la Pia" in Canto V of Purgatorio. In this canto, Dante and Virgil encounter souls who repented at the time of their violent deaths and now reside in the second division of Ante-Purgatory, which is at the base of the mountain of Purgatory. La Pia's tale follows the violent stories of Buonconte da Montefeltro and Jacopo del Cassero where she briefly says:

Please remember me, who am La Pia.
Siena made me, in Maremma I was undone.
He knows how, the one who, to marry me,
first gave the ring that held his stone. (Note: Hollander translation, Purgatorio, Canto V, lines 130–136.)

Pia tells Dante that she came from Siena and implies that her husband killed her in Maremma. She also asks Dante, once he has rested from his journey, to remember her in his prayers when he returns to Earth (because prayers can shorten her time in Purgatory) since she knows no one else on Earth will pray for her. La Pia additionally stresses the importance of Dante's prayer by using the imperative form of remember. Prayer is a joint activity in turning to God that strengthens human bonds, which has been likened to a city; the city of Siena has been argued to be seen as a purgatorial city where its population is on the journey to salvation. Siena is further seen as a place where human ties are formed, whereas Maremma is where ties are broken.

Pia's calm symmetry in verse 134 (which translates as "Siena made me, unmade me Maremma") places her on a higher plane of understanding than her two predecessors. This line also echoes Virgil's epitaph ("Mantua gave me birth, Calabria took me off") which highlights the cyclic nature of Pia’s life while simultaneously emphasizing the brevity of her life on Earth.

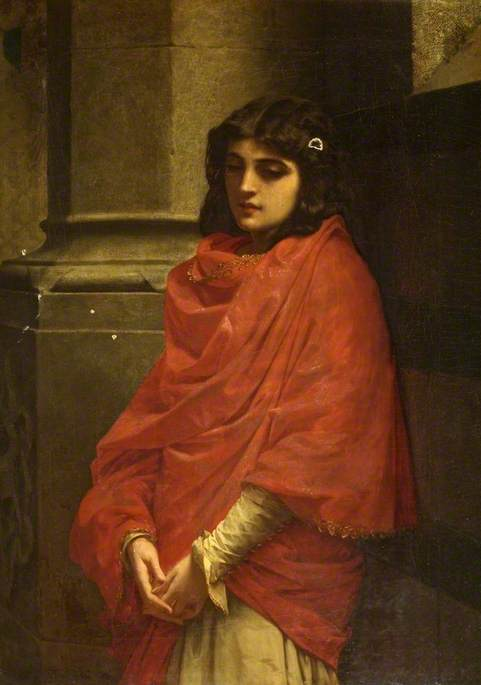
Pia de' Tolomei by Raffaele Giannetti

Furthermore, Pia's remarkable capacity for forgiveness is demonstrated in her replacement of her husband with Maremma as the grammatical subject of her murder. This compassion juxtaposes the allusion to her violent death, concluding the canto with a sense of absolution. Moreover, in her last line, Pia recalls her marriage by her wedding ring's gem, which is gemma in Italian, possibly referring to Dante’s wife Gemma Donati. This posits the hopeful notion that Gemma may forgive Dante for leaving her due to his political exile from Florence. This sweeping absolution contributes to the overarching compassion that characterizes this canto. Despite Pia's seeming fragility it has been argued that she is ultimately victorious over her husband via love by forgiving him.

Pia’s story echoes that of the penitent thief who, in Christian belief, was crucified with Christ. He repents and makes a similarly modest request to Christ to be remembered by him in Heaven, thus acquiring eternal salvation after his violent death.

=== Canto V ===
In the context of Canto V, the narratives of the three souls encountered are similarly structured: They start with captatio benevolentiae, followed by a remembrance of Earth and a request for prayers, then they explain the circumstances of their death, and finally, they tell Dante about their violent death. It has also been noted that the souls' deaths in this canto are all conveyed by a visual disunion of the soul and the body; in Pia's case, this is shown by her "unmade" body.

It has been argued that this canto has a transitory theme in many ways: The souls' accounts highlight the fluid transition between bodily death and spiritual life and explore temporal identity in the corporeal body at the time of death. A transition can further be construed between the delicate nature of the body and the body-ego, more specifically from a gendered perspective as the narrative progresses from male egoism to feminine humility. Unlike her predecessors, Pia forsakes the first-person pronoun for a third-person one by inserting the feminine definite article before her name; Pia detaches from her earthly being since she understands her corporeal body as a temporal object. Moreover, every character in this canto is the subject of the gerund except la Pia, who operates as its object in the last verse where instead her husband is the subject, demonstrating Pia as the object of male constructs. Additionally, all three souls in this canto die at borders of the earth and water; Pia dies in swampland, thus returning to Mother Earth. Pia relocates us from Siena to Maremma, contrasting the respective city and swamp. The ending image of the swamp acts as the maternal sea that ultimately absorbs all egos, as the volatility of water can be construed as the volatility inherent to humans. Furthermore, Maremma evokes sea (mare), the seas (maria), as well as the Virgin mother (Maria, madre, mamma), thus cementing its maternal nature. Hence, it is argued that la Pia has the greatest grasp of the three souls in this canto on the ultimate return of all physical, linguistic, and rational beings through water to Mother Earth and thus the spiritual afterlife.

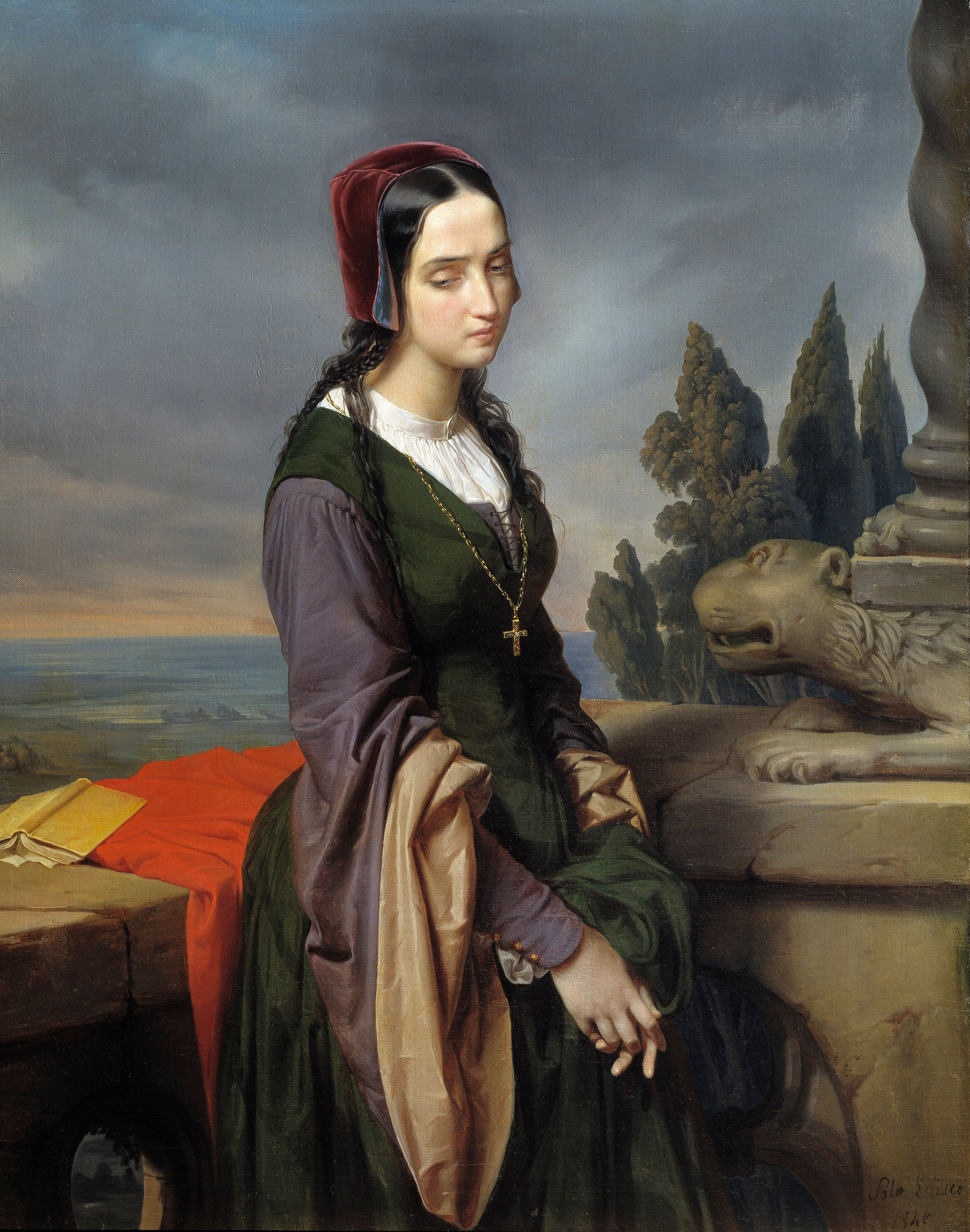
Melancholy, or Pia de' Tolomei by Eliseo Sala, 1846.

Pia's account also stands out from her two predecessors: Jacopo’s intense tone is followed by Buonconte’s turbulent one ending in Pia's tone of lament, forming a sonata of sorts. Her narrative is also uniquely unspecific but still makes an accusation, albeit a less hostile one. Her modest request for prayer is also unique as she first wishes Dante to rest after he returns to Earth before asking for his prayer, and she also doesn't ask Dante to tell her story on Earth unlike most souls in Purgatory. Moreover, Jacopo and Buonconte confess their sins, but Pia does not, leaving the cause for her state in Purgatory unknown. It has been suggested that Pia still dwells upon her husband's betrayal, which is why she is still in Purgatory. Additionally, Pia’s death is the result of a personal relationship unlike her predecessors whose narratives revolve around political circumstances. Ultimately, Pia's pious speech is argued to humbly conclude a graphic canto.

=== Female characters ===
Pia joins Francesca da Rimini and Piccarda Donati as a victim of domestic abuse whose encounter with Dante is characterized by compassion. It has been argued that together they chart a progression to salvation: from Francesca’s passionate narrative to Pia’s concentration on her ultimate redemption, ending in Piccarda’s submission to God's will. Comparisons have been made between la Pia and Francesca as they both courteously tell Dante of their violent deaths by their husbands. It has been argued that Francesca, however, grieves because her death terminated her affair, not because of her damned state, which is shown by her lengthy narration of her first meeting with her lover. On the other hand, la Pia’s account demonstrates Francesca’s error of failing to turn to God; Pia’s repentance freed her from her marriage which earned her salvation, the privilege Francesca does not have. All three narrations are thus argued to demonstrate degrees of understanding of love in the course to God.

=== Interpretations ===
Orthodox views find Pia to be a virtuous victim killed at the hands of her malicious husband, a flirtatious woman who pushed her husband to the edge, or a woman murdered by her husband for a specific offense. These views find that la Pia’s gentle narrative recovers a sense of propriety after the graphic accounts of her two predecessors. However, revisionist views claim these contribute to sentimentalized understandings of Pia and argue that Pia’s account is powerful in the spiritual understanding she has come to, whereby she contrasts her short-lived life on Earth to the immortal link between her soul and God. This view also claims that her account emphasizes the importance of prayers for souls in Purgatory to ascend and that her name is related to piety, both of which reinforce her spiritual understanding of divine grace.

== Biography ==
=== Possible identities ===
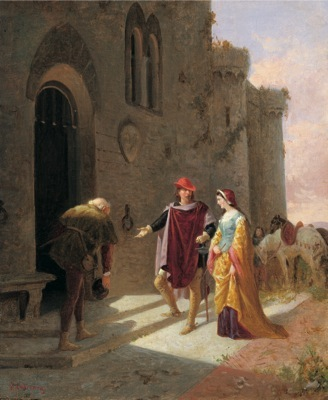
Pia de' Tolomei taken to the castle of Maremma by Vincenzo Cabianca.

The identification of "la Pia" with Pia de' Tolomei is almost universally accepted, although conclusive documentary proof is yet to be found. Early commentators of the Divine Comedy noted that she was identified as a woman of the Tolomei family from Siena, the unnamed first wife of Nello dei Pannocchieschi. There is also a surviving record of Nello's second marriage to Margherita Aldobrandeschi, countess of Sovana and Pitigliano. It is theorized that Nello murdered Pia at his Castel di Pietra in 1297 either after she found out he was having an affair with Margherita or to clear the way for his second marriage. It is uncertain whether Margherita contributed to Pia’s death since there is evidence of a papal plot that forced her into marrying Nello.

Against this identification, it has been argued that the Tolomei family had no daughters or nieces named Pia in Nello's time. However, another theory posits that Pia was born a Malavoti and entered the Tolomei family by her marriage to Baldo d'Aldobrandino de' Tolomei. According to this version of the events, Pia was accused of adultery by Baldo, then was kidnapped by Nello and taken to Maremma, where she died. An alternate theory is that Pia married Nello after Baldo's death. However, this has been challenged by evidence that she never remarried and Nello’s will having no mention of Pia. Another theory is that she was the wife of Tollo di Prata and was in Nello’s custody after Tollo's death, but there is not enough evidence to support this theory.

=== Death ===
It has been theorized that Pia was killed by being thrown out of a window, so her crash into the earth would make her words Maremma "unmade" her literal. An alternate theory suggests Pia was a neglected bride who perished from malaria. Among the early commentators, Jacopo della Lana, the Ottimo Commento, and Francesco da Buti claim that she may have been killed for some crime, while Benvenuto da Imola and the so-called "Anonimo Fiorentino" (an anonymous Florentine commentary from c. 1400) assert that her death was due to her husband's jealousy. The only consensus on Pia's death is its secrecy, which is why la Pia says that only her husband knows how she died.

== In popular culture ==
=== Literature ===
- Novelle (prima parte, novella XII), collection by Matteo Bandello (1554) where la Pia is portrayed as having an affair with Agostino de' Ghisi, for which she is strangled by Nello's henchmen in Maremma.
- La Pia de' Tolomei: leggenda romantica, verse novella by Bartolomeo Sestini (1822) in which la Pia dies by malaria.
- Pia de' Tolomei, tragedy by Carlo Marenco (1836)
- Pia de' Tolomei, popular poem by Giuseppe Moroni, known as il Niccheri (1873)
- Pia de' Tolomei, novel by Carolina Invernizio (1879)
- Pia de' Tolomei, short poem by Giuseppe Baldi (1889)
- Pia de' Tolomei´, short romantic poem by the Czech writer Julius Zeyer, part of the book From the annals of love II., in Czech: Z letopisů lásky (1892)
- Pia de' Tolomei. Romanzo storico, novel by Diana Da Lodi (1900)
- La leggenda della Pia, novel by Decimo Mori (1907)
- Dialogo della Palude by Marguerite Yourcenar (1930)
- Pia de' Tolomei. Composizione in ottava rima secondo la tradizione cantata, re-issue of the short poem by Giuseppe Moroni, known as il Niccheri, edited by Guglielmo Amerighi (1972)
- Pia de' Tolomei (racconto di vita e morte), play by Luca Rossi detto Lam (2003)
- Pia de' Tolomei e le "Notizie sulle Maremme toscane", short poem by Bartolomeo Sestini, edited by Alessandro Bencistà, (2005)
- Matrimonio di sangue, novel by Mario Sica (2007)
- La Gemma di Siena by Marina Fiorato

=== Music ===
- Pia de' Tolomei, opera by Gaetano Donizetti and Salvadore Cammarano (1837), using the verse novella by Bartolomeo Sestini (1822) in which Nello's henchmen poison la Pia.
- La Pia, dalla Divina Commedia di Dante, melody by Antonino Palminteri (circa 1881)
- Dante's Prayer, song by Loreena McKennitt in the album The Book of Secrets (1997)
- ¿Pia?, one-act musical dialogue by Azio Corghi (libretto by Azio Corghi, freely adapting "Il dialogo della palude" by M. Yourcenar) (premiere 9 July 2004)
- La Divina Commedia, opera by Marco Frisina (2007)
- Pia come la canto io, concept album by Gianna Nannini (2007)
- La Pia de' Tolomei, rock opera by Gianna Nannini, libretto by Pia Pera (2010)
- ‘Ptolemaea’ from the concept album, Preachers Daughter by Ethel Cain (2022)

=== Cinema ===
- Pia de' Tolomei, directed by Gerolamo Lo Savio (1910)
- Pia de' Tolomei, directed by Esodo Pratelli (1941)
- Pia de' Tolomei, directed by Sergio Grieco (1958)
