= Raffaello Sorbi =

Italian painter (1844–1931)

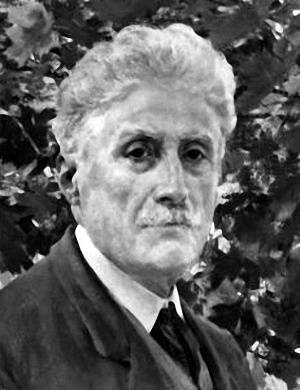
- Self-Portrait, 1922
- Born: February 24, 1844; Florence
- Died: December 19, 1931; Florence
- Known for: Painting

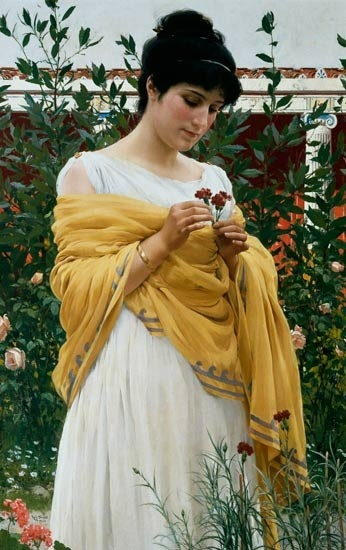
The Gazebo (1885)

Raffaello Sorbi (Italian: [raffaˈɛllo ˈsɔrbi]; February 24, 1844 – December 19, 1931) was an Italian painter, specializing in narrative painting.

== Biography ==
As a young man, he studied design in the Royal Academy of Fine Arts in Florence; then painting under professor Antonio Ciseri. By 18 years, he had completed his first major work: Corso Donati mortally wounded is transported by Monks of San Salvi to their Abbey (see gallery). The painting won an award at the Florentine Triennale contest of 1861. He completed commissions for patrons in America and England. In 1863, he won a contest in Rome with the essay piece Savonarola explains the Bible to some friends in the Convent of San Marco. He was unable to make use of the stipend attached to the prize. In Florence, he exhibited a work depicting Piccarda Donati kidnapped from the Convent of Santa Chiara, by her brother Corso. He completed a St Catherine of Siena before an angry Florentine mob after concluding peace with the Pope, by commission for signore marchese Carlo Torrigiani. His painting of Imelda de' Lambertazzi e Bonifazio Geremei (lovers from Donizetti's opera) was sold to Wilhelm Metzler of Frankfort, Germany. In 1869, the sculptor Giovanni Duprè visited his studio, and commissioned a Phidias sculpts the Minerva Statue.

After this work, Sorbi produced mainly small canvases, mostly sold through the Goupil Gallery of Paris. Many are of antique Roman (Neo-Pompeian) or from the historical Tuscan past: Regatta in the Arno: il Girotondo; Il Decamerone; The Florentine Concert : Il Triclinio; The Vestal Virgins exit the Amphitheater after the spectacle: Il venditore di terre cotte; A family scene under a peristyle; Cornelia mother of the Gaius and Tiberius Gracchus. Other paintings are genre scenes in 18th-century dress and finery. Among his works, Lo Corsa delle carrette nel Circo and il serraglio agli sposi, were bought by the Silley of London, and Le Maggiolate bought by Signor Egisto Vannucci of Florence. Many of his works were acquired by English collectors.

Among his works are a series of games, including Il Giuoco delle Bocce, delle Carte, del Pallone, della Ruzzola, and della Mora. He painted a Convalesence of Dante. In 1870, at the Mostra of Fine Arts di Parma, he displayed La strada. Sorbi became academician at the Royal Institute of Fine Arts of Florence and resident professor and honorary associate of the Royal Academy of Fine Arts of Urbino.

Sorbi died in Florence on December 19, 1931.

== Gallery ==
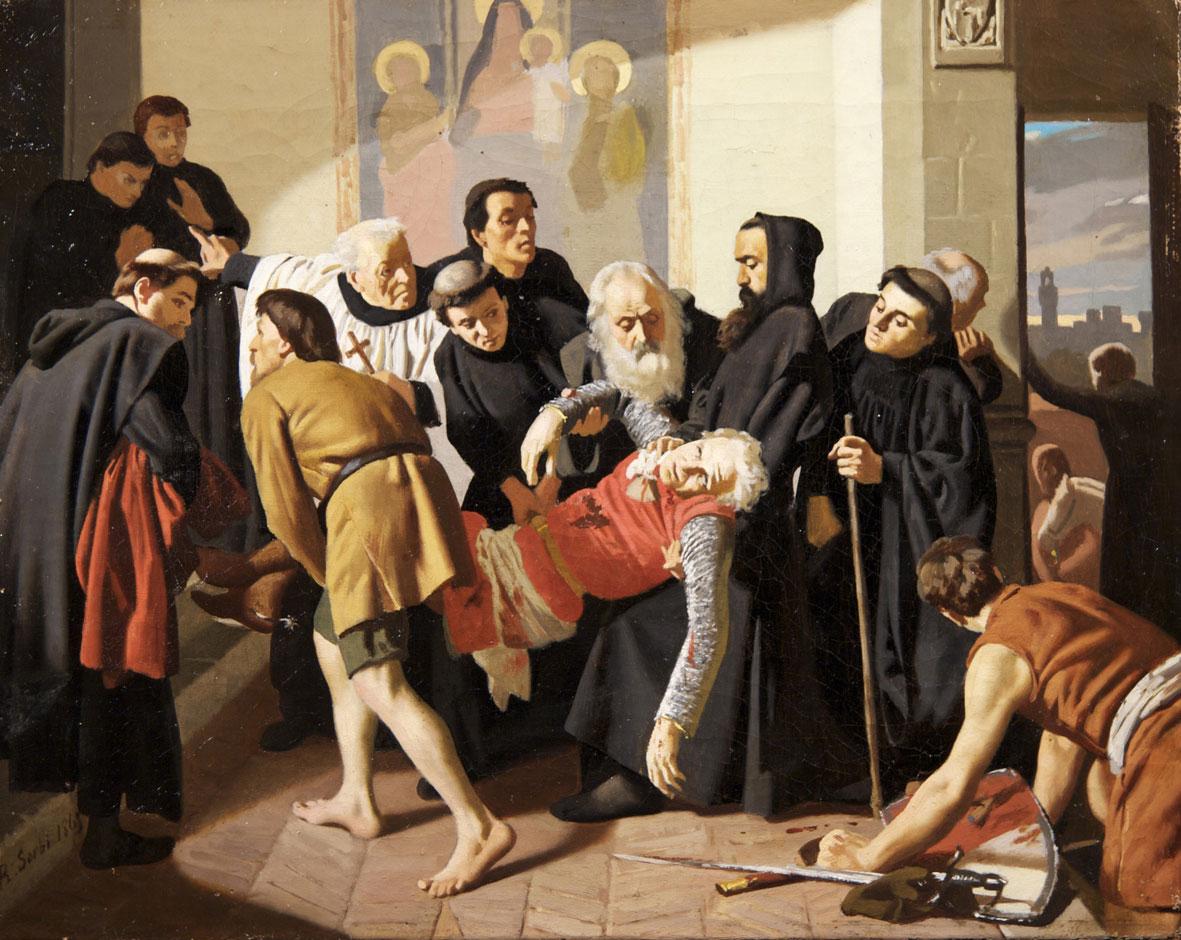
Corso Donati mortally wounded is transported by Monks of San Salvi to their Abbey (1861)

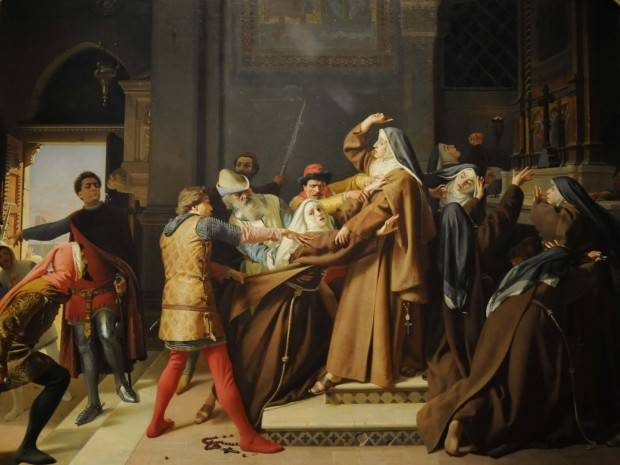
Piccarda Donati kidnapped from the Convent of Santa Chiara, by her brother Corso (1866)

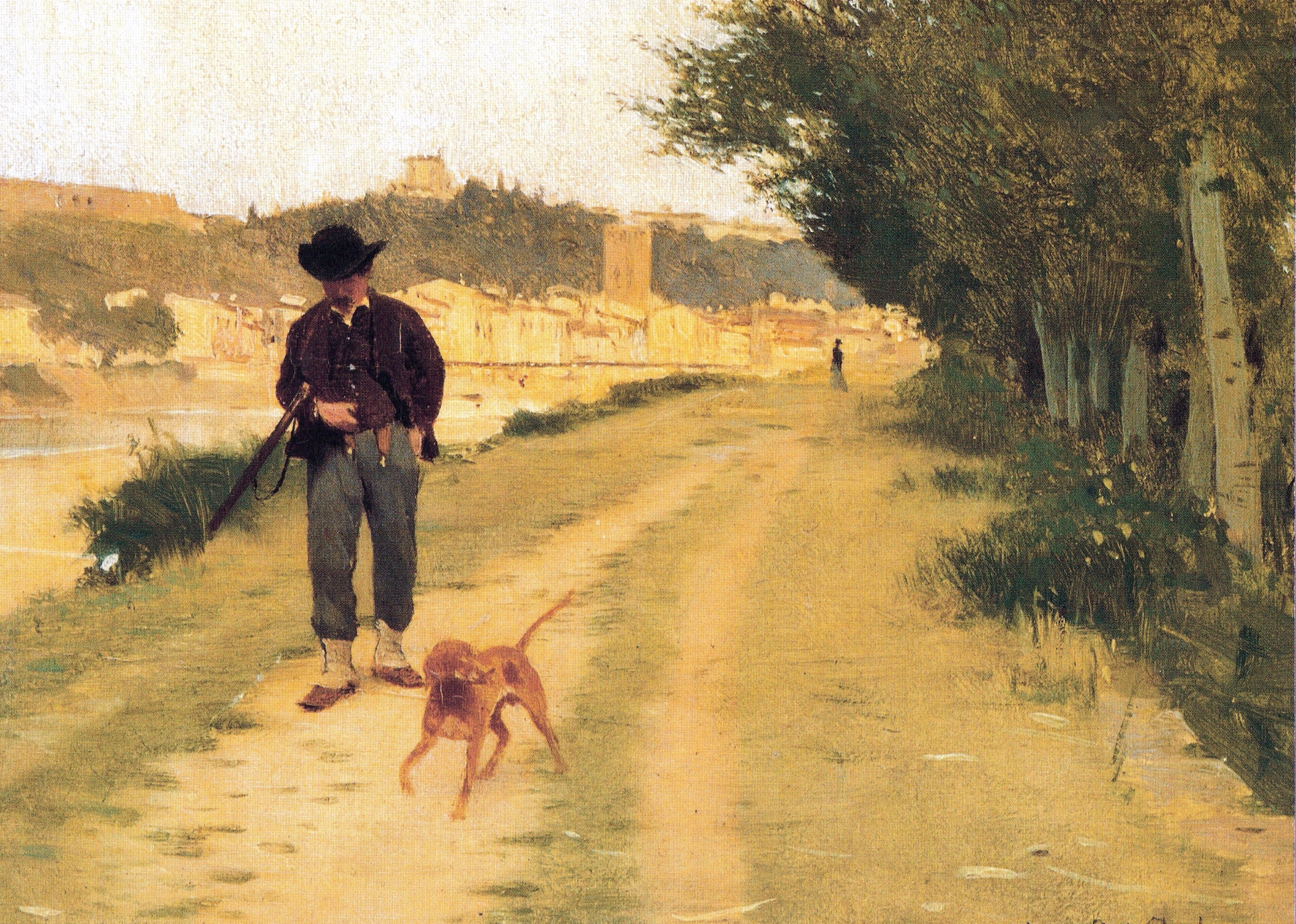
View of Florence and Arno River (1872)

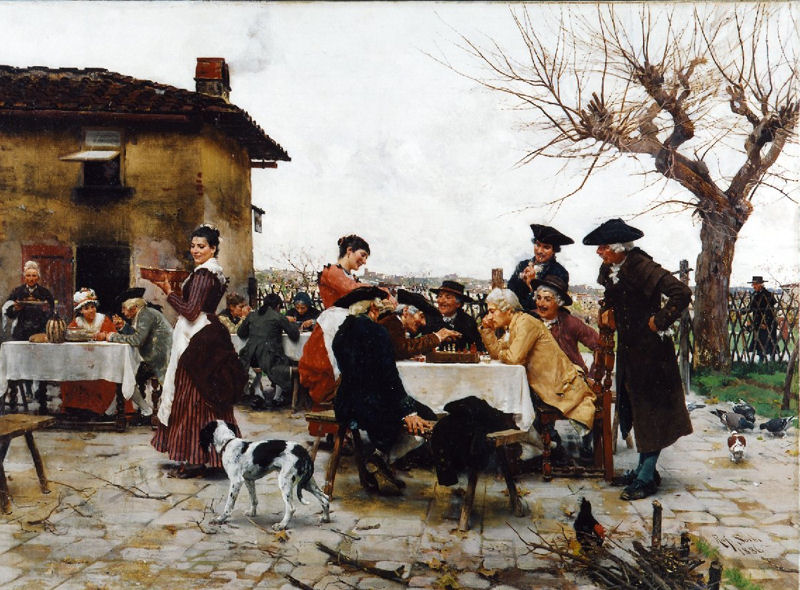
The Chess-players (1886)

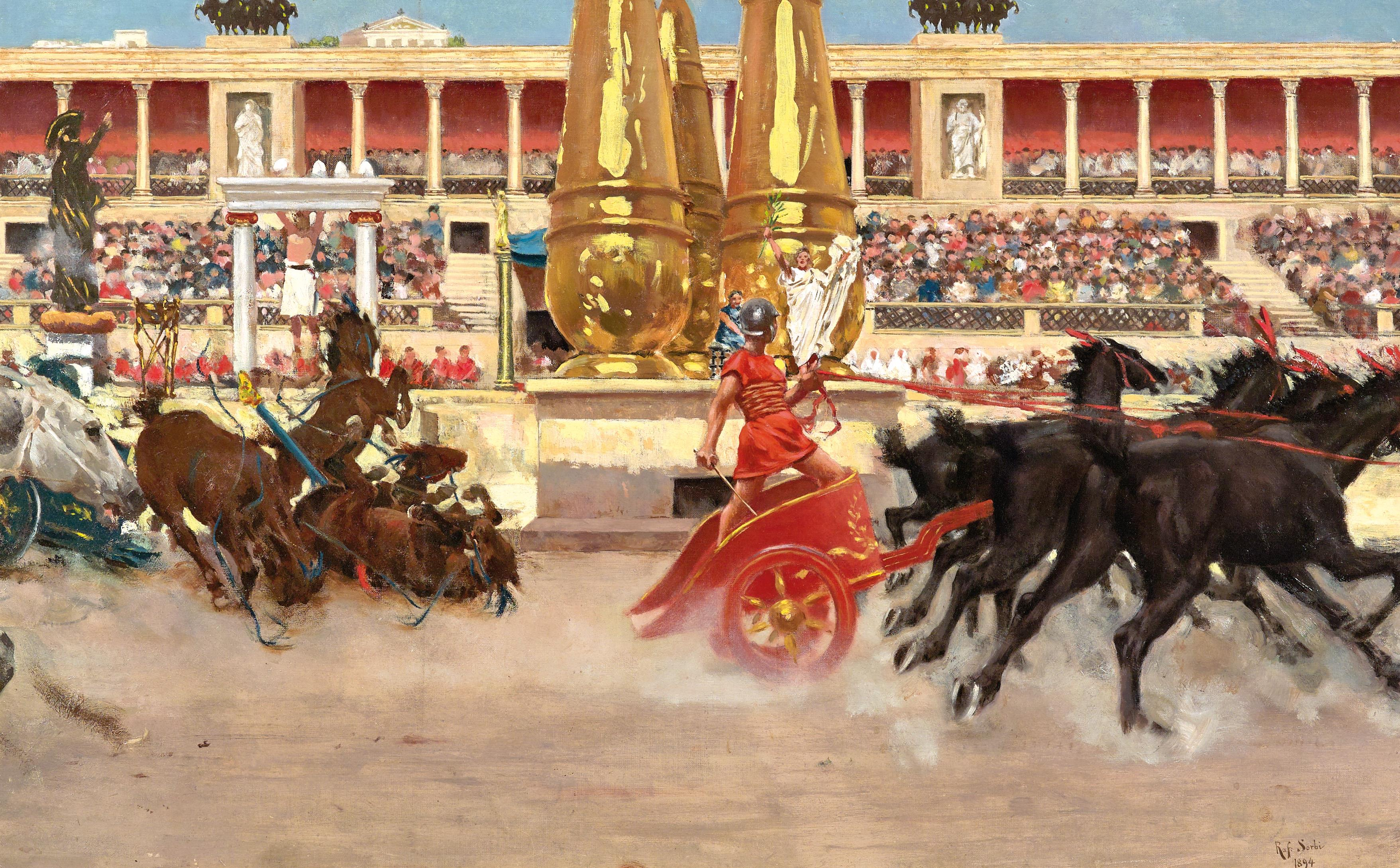
Chariot Race in the Circus (1894)

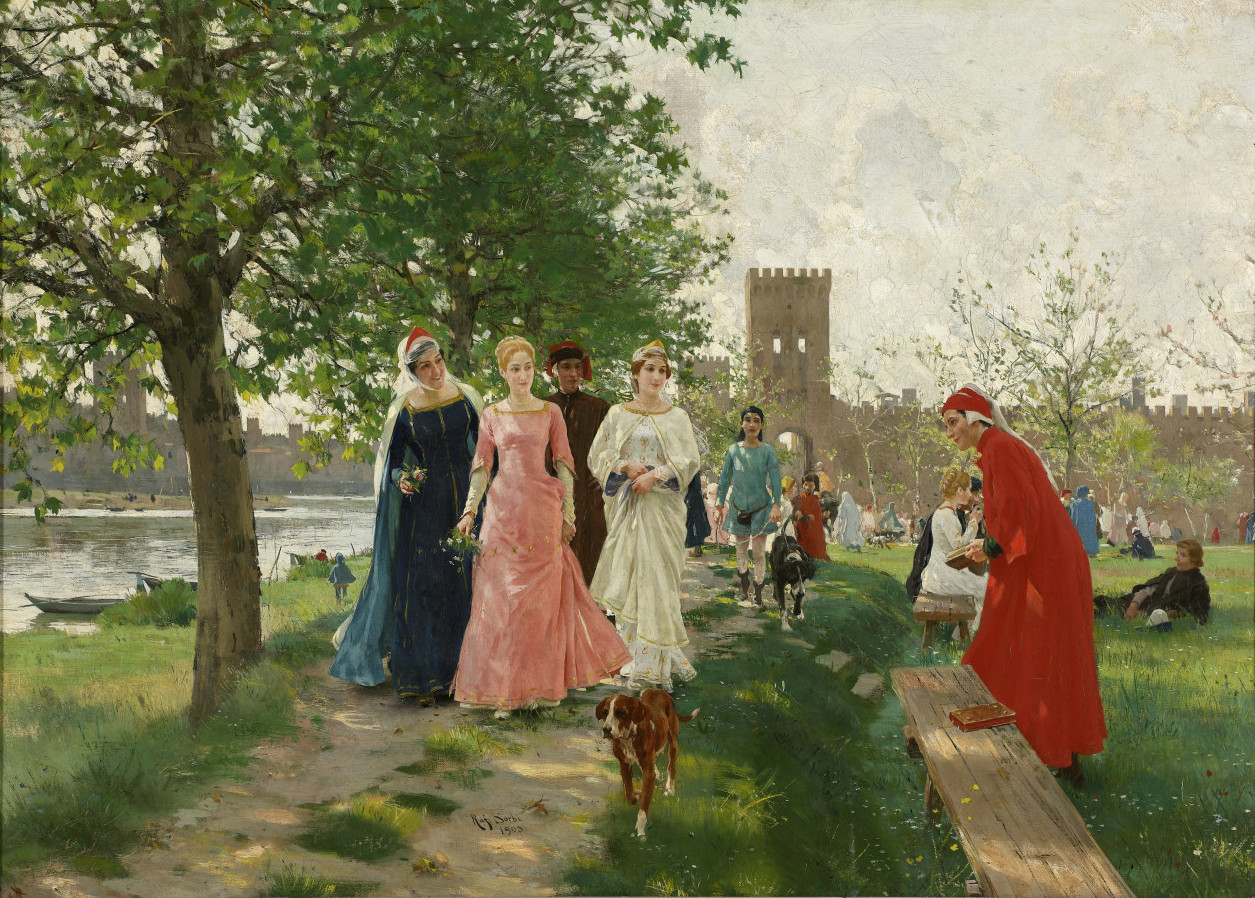
Dante meets Beatrice (1903)

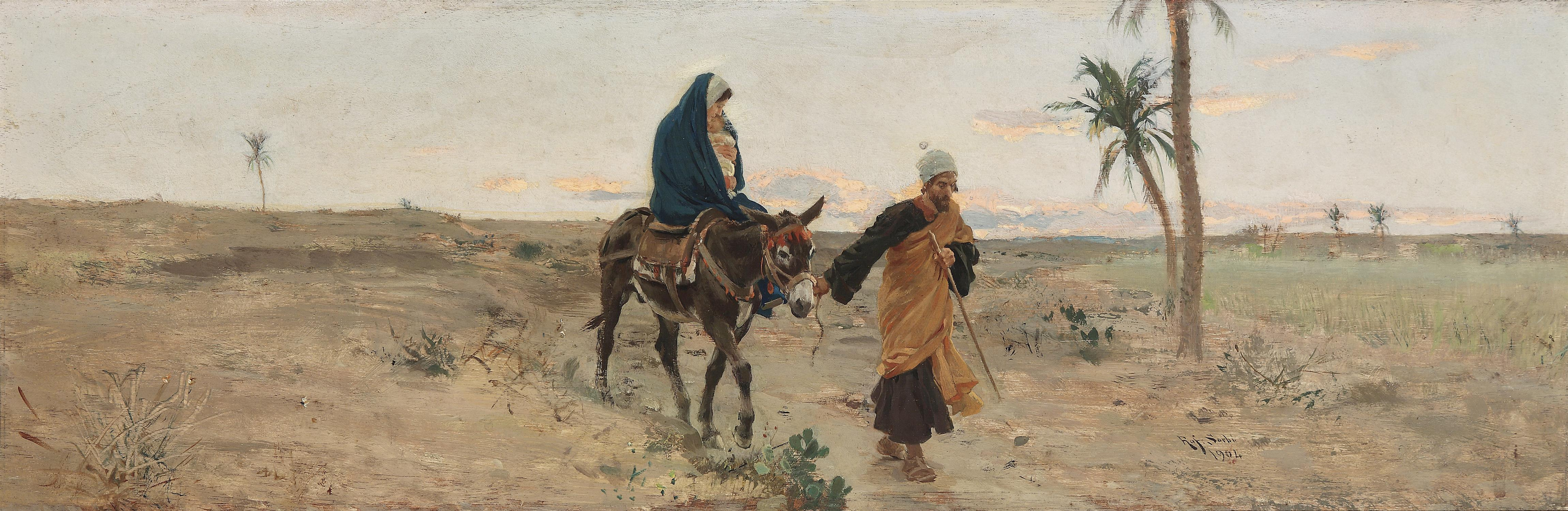
Flight to Egypt (1904)

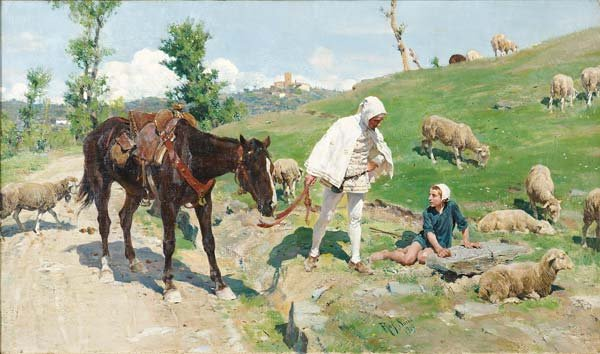
Giotto and Cimabue (1919)

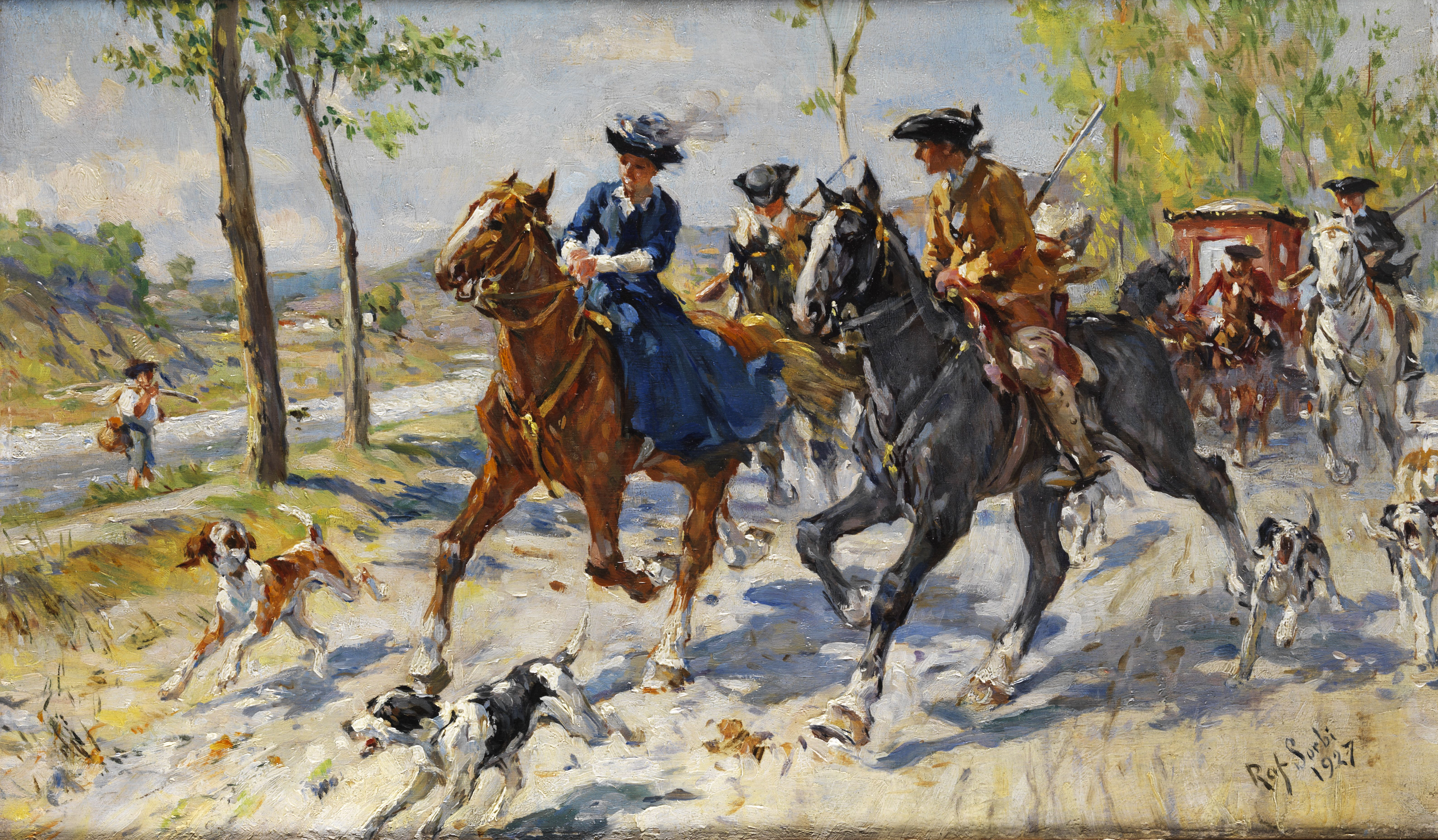
The Ride (1927)

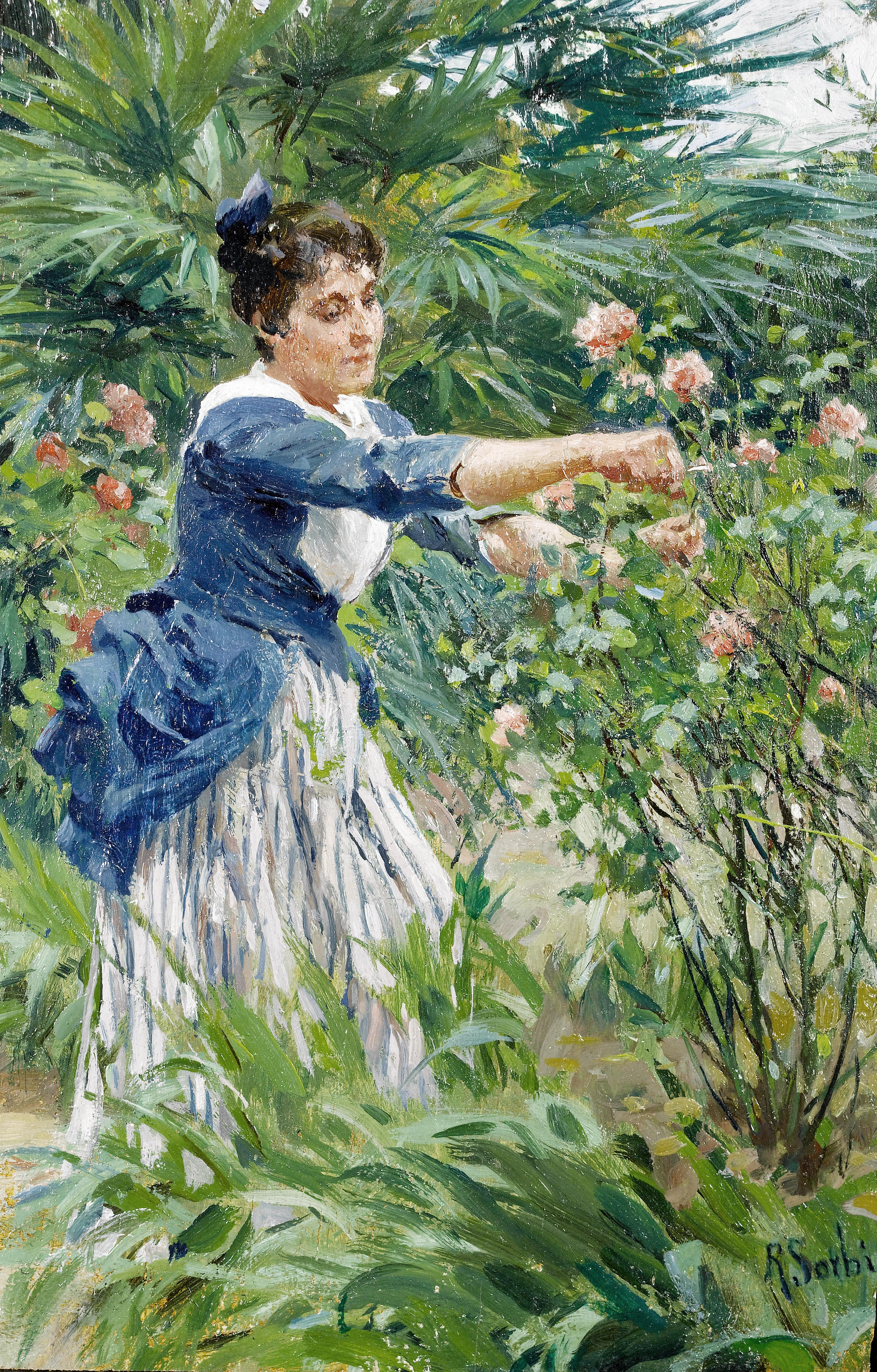
Pruning the Roses

== Works ==
- Grazzia. Russell-Cotes Art Gallery & Museum, Bournemouth, England.
- Italian Girl with Doves (1866). Cragside, Rothbury, Northumberland, England.
