= Jacopo del Cassero =

Italian magistrate and condottiero (1260–1298)

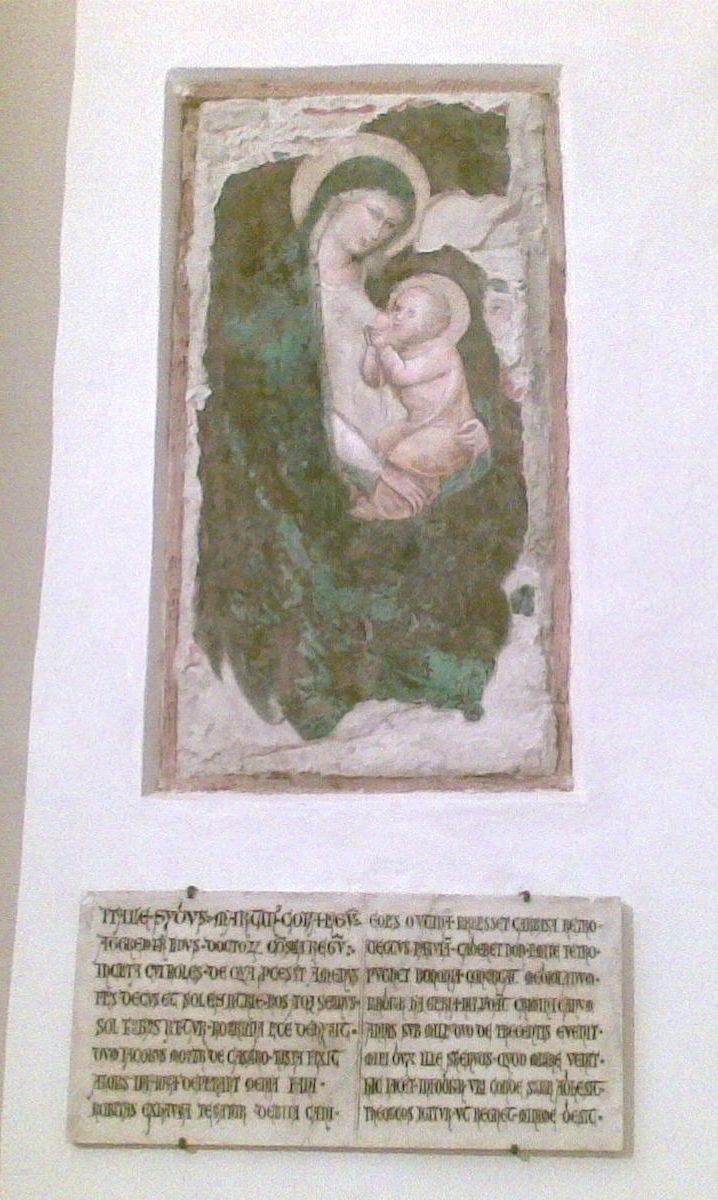
Madonna del Latte and funerary epigraph placed above the tomb of Jacopo del Cassero.

Jacopo del Cassero (Fano, c. 1260 - Oriago, 1298) was a magistrate and condottiero from late medieval Italy. He appears as a character in Dante Alighieri's Purgatorio.

== Life ==
Jacopo del Cassero was born in Fano around 1260. He was the son of Uguccione and was part of the powerful Guelph family of Berarda. He was a Guelph magistrate of Fano, and between 1288 and 1289 he participated with the Guelphs of the Marche region allied with Florence in the Battle of Campaldino against the Ghibellines of Arezzo. Here is where he probably met Dante.

Jacopo defended Bologna, a city of which he was mayor from 1296 to 1297, from the expansionist aims of Azzo VIII d'Este, lord of Ferrara. In 1298, Jacopo was elected mayor of Milan, and to reach the city he prudently decided to pass through Venice by sea and continue by land, thus avoiding the territories of the Este family. Despite this, while he was in Padua on the banks of the Brenta, near the marshes that surrounded the castle of Oriago, he was reached by assassins sent by Azzo VIII and was wounded in the leg and groin. He sought shelter in a swamp where he bled to death.

Today his remains rest in the Church of San Pietro in Episcopio in Fano after being kept until 1994 at the Church of San Domenico under the protection of the Madonna del Latte.

== In Dante's Divine Comedy ==
Jacopo del Cassero appears as a character in the Divine Comedy, composed between 1308 and 1321, where he is featured in canto 5 of Purgatorio alongside Pia de' Tolomei and Bonconte da Montefeltro.

Dante the pilgrim meets Jacopo among the souls who were victims of violent deaths and repented for their sins in the very last moments of their lives. When these souls first take notice of the pilgrim, they are amazed by his mortal status, and thus flock around him to tell him of their stories. When Jacopo steps forward, he asks Dante to make the truth known to his relatives so that they pray for him and thus his time spent in Ante-Purgatory is shortened. He then proceeded to tell the pilgrim of the moment of his death.
