= Aimery IV of Narbonne =

- Born: Aimery IV of Narbonne; 1230
- Died: October 1298 (aged 67–68)
- Occupations: condottiero; captain
- Spouse: Joanna of L'Isle Jourdain
- Parents: Amaury I of Narbonne (father); Philippa d'Anduze (mother)

Aimery IV (or Aimeric IV) (Italian: Amerigo di Narbona) (c. 1230 – October 1298) was the Viscount of Narbonne, an Italian condottiero and captain. Aimery first entered Italy in the service of Charles I of Anjou, who had been granted the Sicilian crown by Pope Clement IV in 1265. Guiraut Riquier, last of the Occitan troubadours, was employed by Aimery.

By 1289, Aimery had so distinguished himself that he was put in command of the Guelph troops massed to attack the Ghibellines of Arezzo. During that campaign, the two armies met at the Battle of Campaldino and Aimery won the victory on which his reputation rests. He conquered most of the Aretine countryside, taking many castles by storm, from Rondine to the gates of Arezzo itself. This, however, he failed to take by siege, as the Aretines made several valiant sorties which successfully destroyed his siege engines. The campaign was nevertheless a success and Aimery was received triumphantly upon his return to Florence, where he was the representative of Charles II of Naples.

Aimery married Joanna, daughter of Jordan IV of L'Isle-Jourdain. The Italian form of his name became popular in Tuscany for centuries after his success at Campaldino and it was via a Tuscan named Amerigo Vespucci that two continents—the Americas—received their names. Giovanni Villani, the Florentine chronicler, calls him "Nerbona" throughout his account.
