= Battle of Pieve al Toppo =

Battle between Arezzo and Siena in 1288

- Part of Guelphs and Ghibellines
Date	26 June 1288
Location	Pieve al Toppo, Province of Arezzo
Result	Arezzo victory
Territorial changes	Arezzo takes over the city.

Belligerents
Arezzo (Ghibelline)	Siena (Guelph)

The Battle of Pieve al Toppo was fought between Arezzo and Siena. The two sides engaged in the battle, and Arezzo was able to take the town. Later on in history, Florence would take over the town, and Arezzo was forced to retake it all over again.

== Background ==
Arezzo was a powerful city state in Medieval Italy. It wanted control of the Province of Siena, but there were already inhabitants, the people of Siena. And so the only choice was war. An excuse was easy to make; Arezzo was Ghibelline, and Siena was Guelph. The two sides were at war in the Wars of the Guelphs and Ghibellines, and Arezzo was given the absolute right to invade Siena.

== Battle ==
After failing to take Arezzo and devastating the surrounding countryside, on their way home the Guelphs sent a force of 3,000 infantry and 6-700 horse under Guido Salvatico Guidi and Ranuccio Farnese to attack the castle of Lucignano about halfway between Siena and Arezzo. The Ghibellines, under Buonconte di Montefeltro and Guglielmo de' Pazzi mustered 2,000 infantry and 300 horse. They either knew the Guelph plan or guessed it and sent half of their infantry to follow the Guelphs, taking the rest of the army by night to Peve al Toppo. The Guelphs arrived there on the morning of 26 June, unprepared for battle; their crossbowmen's pavises and their knights' lances had been packed away and the horsemen's shields tied to their saddles.

The Ghibbelines launched an attack from cover of marshland with their crossbows, striking the flanks of the Guelphs. Whilst the Guelphs were still recovering from this, a cavalry charge broke their formation and they fled the field. The battles between the Ghibbelines and the small groups of retreating Guelphs became known as the "jousts of Toppo" and were referenced in Dante's Inferno when he meets a victim of the battle. Around 300 horsemen were killed, mostly Guelphs, and 200 captured; a number of infantry were also taken prisoner. Farnese was killed on the battlefield.

== Aftermath ==
After the Battle of Pieve al Toppo, the victors burnt the town of Civitella in Val di Chiana, wrecking or damaging all of the buildings. In the years in the wake of the battle, the city-state of Florence swept off the Arezzo territories in the Province of Siena, and took over the city in 1289. This was because of the defeat of Arezzo by the Guelphs at the Battle of Campaldino. Arezzo found itself at war with Florence, and the city fell after a short battle in 1311. Pieve al Toppo remained in the hands of Arezzo until 1348, when it became the seat of a Florentine podesta.

== See also ==
- Arezzo
- Battle of Campaldino
