= Donati =

Donati is an Italian surname. Notable people with the surname include:

- Angelo Donati (1885–1960), Italian banker and philanthropist
- Baldassare Donati (1525/30–1603), Italian composer of the late Renaissance
- Bianca Donati (born 1995), Argentine field hockey player
- Buoso Donati (—ca. 1285), character in Dante's Divine Comedy
- Cianfa Donati (—bef. 1289), character in Dante's Divine Comedy
- Corso Donati (–1308), leader of the Black Guelphs in Florence, brother of Forese and Piccarda
- Danilo Donati (1926–2001), Italian costume designer
- Enrico Donati (1909–2008), American Surrealist painter and sculptor of Italian birth
- Forese Donati (–1296), brother of Corso and Piccarda, a friend of Dante Alighieri included as a character in the Divine Comedy
- Giovanni Battista Donati (1826–1873), Italian astronomer
- Giulio Donati (born 1990), Italian footballer
- Giuseppe Donati (1836–1925), inventor of the modern ocarina
- Ignazio Donati (c. 1570–1638), Italian composer
- Jeremiah Donati, American collegiate athletic director
- Massimo Donati (born 1981), Italian footballer
- Matteo Donati (born 1995), Italian tennis player
- Piccarda Donati (13th century), sister to Corso and Forese, included as a character in Dante's Divine Comedy
- Robert Donati (1940–1991), American organized-crime figure suspected of masterminding the Isabella Stewart Gardner Museum theft
- Silvano Donati (born 1942), scientist, professor of photonics
- Virgil Donati (born 1958), Australian drummer
- Vitaliano Donati (1717–1762), Italian botanist

== See also ==
- Comet Donati
- Donati (crater) named after Giovanni Battista Donati
- Donatus of Evorea, an Albanian saint known as Shën Donati in Albanian.
