= Corso Donati =

Florentine leader of the Black Guelphs

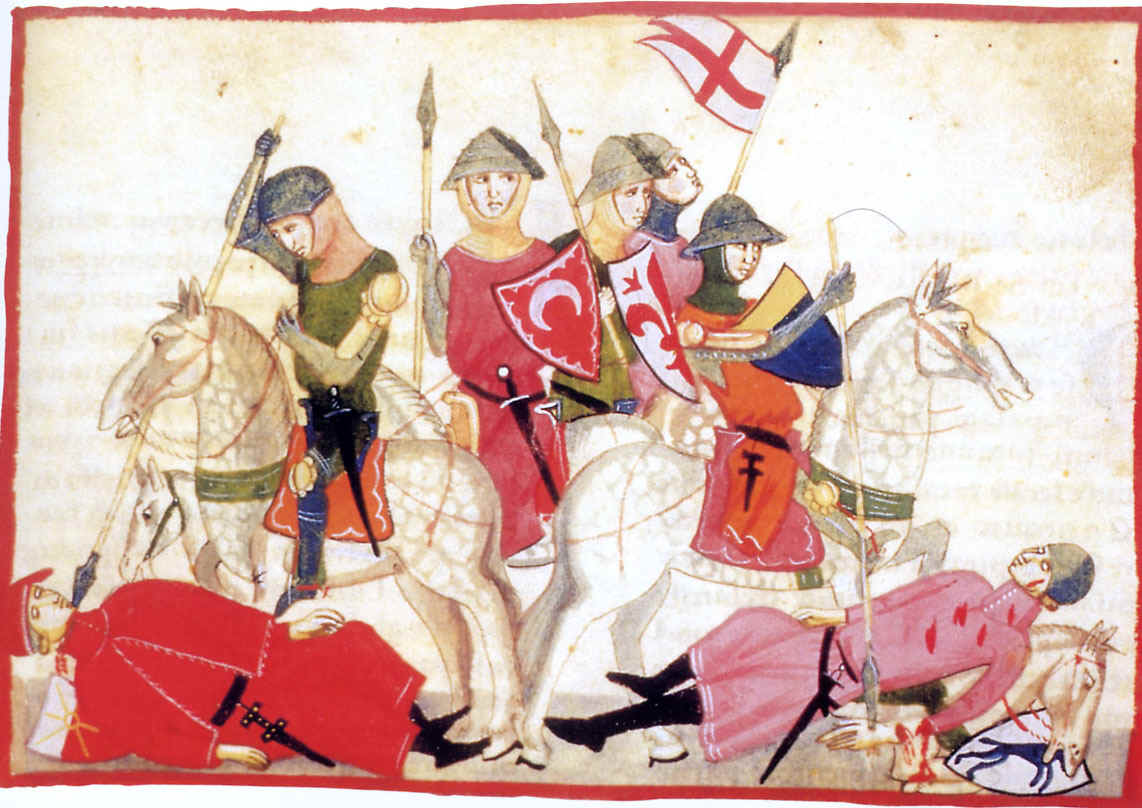

Corso Donati (c. 1250 – 6 October 1308) was a politician and leader of the Black Guelph faction in 13th- and early 14th- century Florence.

== Bologna and Pistoia ==
In the late thirteenth century, power in Florence and the other Tuscan cities was divided between the Podestà, an outsider who served as chief magistrate, and the guildmasters. Corso served as Podestà of Bologna in 1283 and 1288, and of Pistoia in 1289. In 1289, as captain of the people in Pistoia, he led a group of soldiers in a cavalry charge at the Battle of Campaldino, in which the Guelphs defeated the Ghibellines and cemented their control over Florence.

== Leader of the Black Guelphs ==
In 1293, the merchants of Florence, led by Giano della Bella, prevented the nobility from taking the office of guildmaster. Corso led the noble faction which aligned with the working class against the merchants. In 1294 Corso was acquitted of killing a man in a fight; an angry mob came to della Bella seeking justice after the acquittal, but he sent them away whereupon they rioted and della Bella was exiled as having caused the riot. At that time, the Cerchi family, leaders of the merchant faction who had long feuded with the Donati, became allied with the White Guelphs while the Donati allied with the Black Guelphs, similar factions which had arisen in Pistoia. The leaders of both Guelph factions, including Corso, were exiled by the merchants in 1300, but the White Guelphs were soon allowed to return. Corso and the Black Guelphs petitioned Pope Boniface VIII for aid, and returned to Florence with Charles of Valois in November 1301, killing or exiling many White Guelphs. One of the exiled was the famous poet Dante Alighieri, who by marrying Gemma Donati had become a distant relative of Corso.

== Plots against the Black Guelphs ==
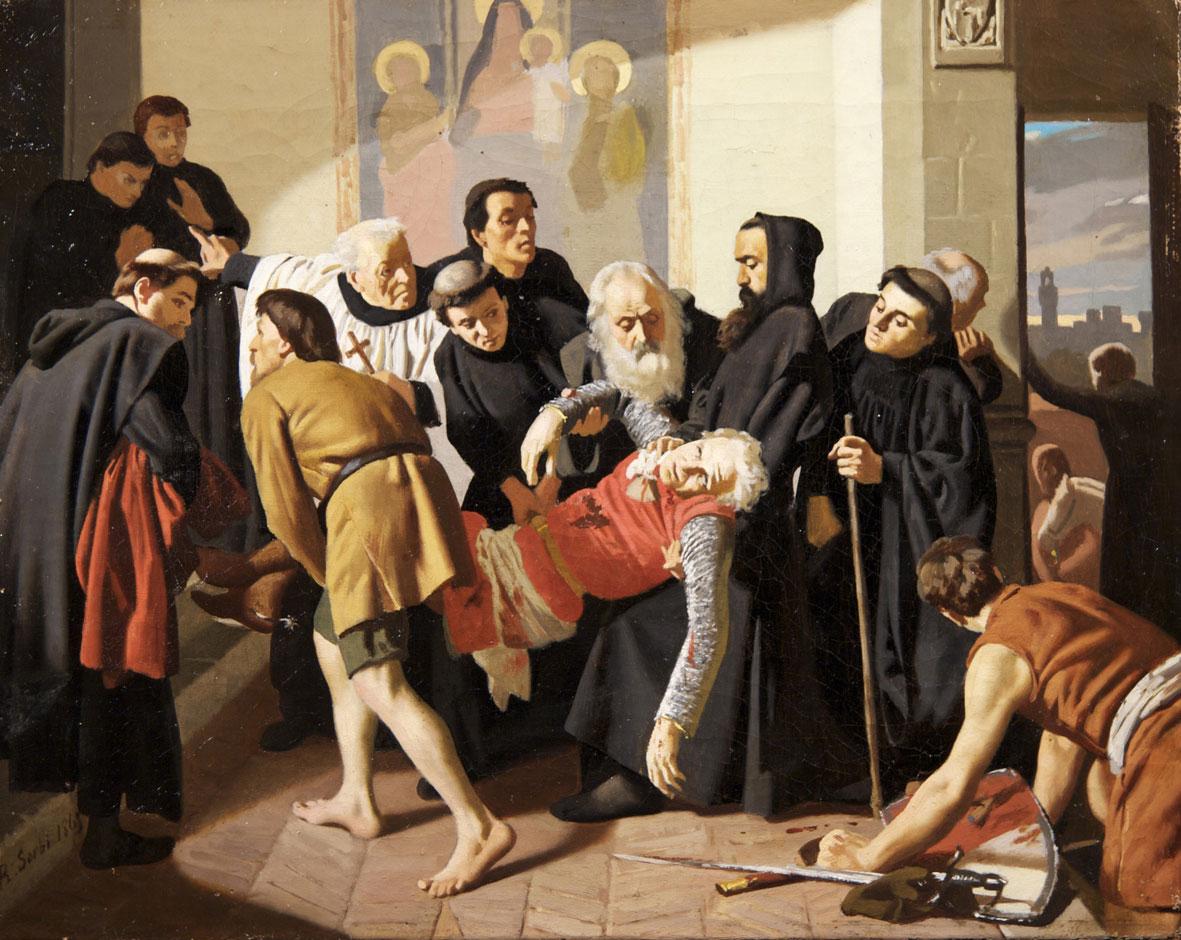
Death of Corso Donati painted by Raffaello Sorbi.

Beginning in February 1303, Corso broke with the other Black Guelphs and joined the Cavalcanti, a family of White Guelphs, in calling for the examination of the finances of his former allies. This led to a new eruption of fighting in which forces from Lucca temporarily controlled Florence. Donati was one of twelve prominent Florentine citizens summoned by Pope Benedict XI in 1304 in an attempt to bring peace to the city; the White Guelphs and some Ghibellines were restored, although the Ghibellines were expelled again in 1306.

In 1308 Corso was accused of plotting to overthrow the Florentine commune and take power as lord of the city with the aid of his father-in-law Uguccione della Faggiuola, a Ghibelline, and was condemned as a rebel and a traitor; he died on October 6, 1308, while attempting to flee the city after having been besieged in his house by an angry mob. He was killed by Berenguer Carroç, a Catalan mercenary part of a company hired by the Guelph League to protect the city.

== In literature ==
He is discussed prominently in several contemporary histories: Niccolò Machiavelli's History of Florence, the Nuova Cronica of Giovanni Villani, and the Cronica delle cose occorrenti ne' tempi suoi of Dino Compagni. Dante's Divine Comedy, which was written after Donati's death but set prior to it in 1300, includes a scene in which Corso's brother Forese indirectly describes Corso as “the one who bears the greatest blame” for the downfall of Florence and foresees him being dragged by a beast into hell. In the Divine Comedy, Corso's sister Piccarda is the first person Dante meets in Paradise. Corso Donati is also the subject of a play by nineteenth-century writer Carlo Marenco, who was inspired by Dante's works.

== Buildings ==
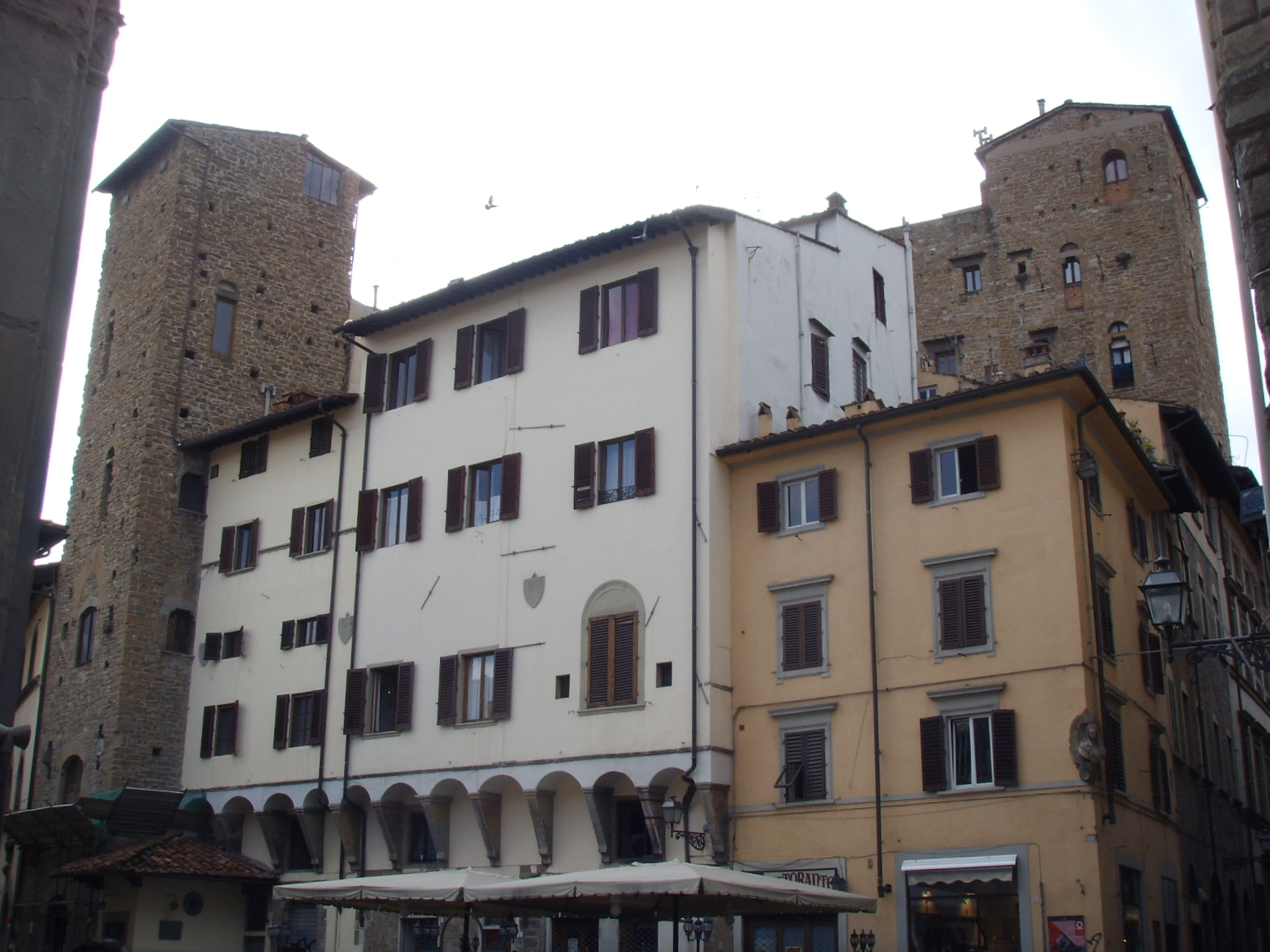
The two towers of Corso Donati

Two buildings owned by and named after Corso, the torri Corso Donati or towers of Corso Donati, still stand in Piazza San Pier Maggiore in Florence.
