= Guidi =

Guidi is an Italian surname shared by several notable people:

- Guidi (family), a medieval noble family
- Alessandro Pier Guidi (born 1983), racing driver from Italy
- Angela Maria Guidi Cingolani (1896–1991), Italian politician
- Angelo Guidi (1888–1953), Italian racing cyclist
- Antonio Guidi (1927–2013), Italian actor and voice actor
- Antonio Guidi (born 1945), Italian politician
- Carlo Alessandro Guidi (1650–1712), Italian lyric poet
- Chen Guidi (born 1942), Chinese writer from Huaiyuan county, Anhui
- Diego Guidi (born 1981), Argentine retired footballer
- Domenico Guidi (1625–1701), Italian sculptor
- Dominique Guidi (born 1996), French professional footballer
- Donna Rachele Guidi (1890–1979), wife of Italian dictator Benito Mussolini
- Emanuele Guidi (born 1969), Sammarinese archer
- Fabrizio Guidi (born 1972), Italian cyclist
- Federica Guidi (born 1969), Italian businesswoman and the former Minister of Economic Development
- Gianluca Guidi (born 1968), Italian rugby union coach and former player
- Gina Guidi (born 1962), American professional female boxer
- Giovanni Francesco Guidi di Bagno, Italian cardinal, brother of cardinal Nicola and nephew of cardinal Colonna
- Giovanni di ser Giovanni Guidi (1406–1486), Italian painter, brother of Masaccio
- Guidarino Guidi (1922–2003), Italian film actor and director
- Guido Guidi (fl. 20th century), Italian comic book artist and penciller
- Guido Guidi (photographer) (born 1941), Italian photographer
- Guido Buffarini Guidi (1895–1945), Italian politician active during the Second World War
- Ignazio Guidi (1844–1935), Italian orientalist
- Jennifer Guidi (born 1972), American artist
- Juan Héctor Guidi (1930–1973), Argentine footballer
- Leonardo Guidi (born 1974), Italian racing cyclist
- Marcello Guidi (born 1997), Italian swimmer
- Nicholas Guidi (born 1983), Italian football defender
- Nicola Guidi di Bagno (1583–1663), titular archbishop of Atenia, bishop of Senigallia, and cardinal
- Osvaldo Guidi (1964–2011), Italian cinema, theater and television actor, and a dramaturge and theater director
- Peter Guidi (1949–2018), American jazz musician
- Scipione Guidi (1884–1966), Italian violinist
- Tommaso di Giovanni di Simone Guidi Masaccio (1401-1428), Italian leading painter
- Valentina Guidi Ottobri (born 1988), Italian art curator
- Virgilio Guidi (1891–1984), Italian artist and writer

== See also ==
- Guido
- Casa Guidi
- Cerreto Guidi, in the Metropolitan City of Florence
- Poppi Castle
