= Valentina Guidi Ottobri (artist) =

Italian art curator

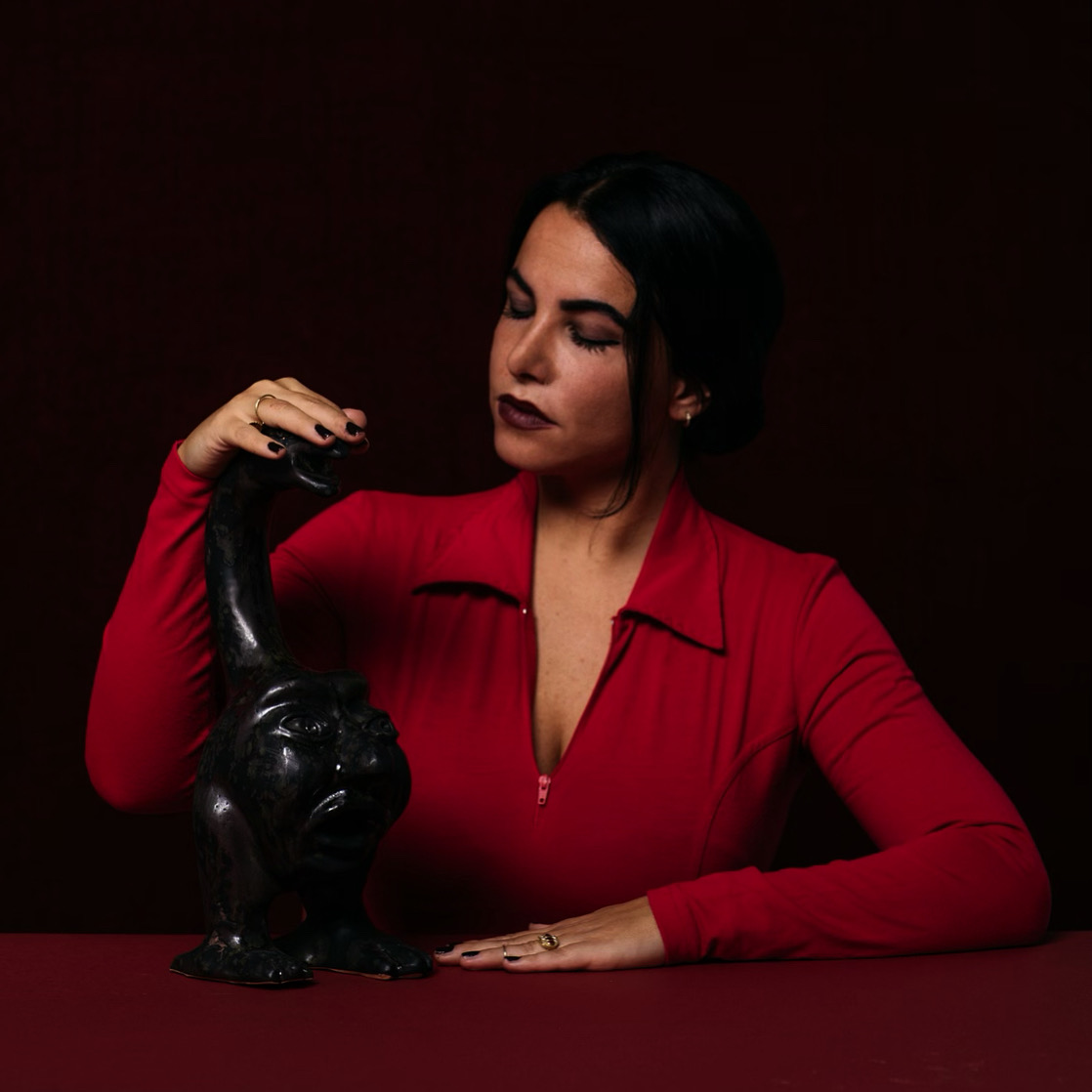
- Born: 1 May 1988 (age 38); Florence, Italy
- Education: University of Siena; Central Saint Martins
- Known for: Her visual aesthetic

Valentina (Guidi) Ottobri (born 1 May 1988) is a contemporary art curator from Florence, Italy.

== Career ==
Ottobri studied communications and semiotics with the Italian author Umberto Eco and graduated from Letter and Philosophy at the University of Siena (UNISI) with a degree in Semiotic in 2010.

In 2011 she earned a master's degree in brand management at the Instituto Marangoni in Milan and eight years later another in curatorial studies at Central Saint Martins in London.

Ottobri worked at Bottega Veneta in public relations and briefly took a job in India as a fashion stylist for Marie Claire magazine.

She returned to Florence in 2012 at the age of 23 and joined the city's exclusive concept store, Luisa Via Roma, first as an assistant jewelry buyer and, eventually, as director of the boutique's homewares department.

Ottobri is the author of several exhibitions including Design on Water (2016) in collaboration with Sky Arte HD as well as Cosmic Sound in 2026.

Actively supporting the young talents generation with a series of stand-alone collections, created in collaboration with small artisanal studios or independently in order to promote creative experimentation.

Her work is found in numerous public collections such as Palazzo Strozzi Museum in Florence, where she curated a performative show in 2017 together with the young artist Reverie contributing to the Bill Viola’s main Show.

In 2018, Ottobri constructed a house within the shop with the help of the Milan-based designer and architect Cristina Celestino; in 2019, she called on the Italian production designer and artist Sara Ricciardi to transform the store of Luisaviaroma into a modern-day Garden of Eden.

She collaborated with several galleries, Foundations (Michelangelo Foundation), museums and Auction Houses. Memorable her show around Alchemy curated for Cambi in 2019.

Her work has been published in various international magazines including The New York Times Magazine, Architectural Digest, Vogue, Artribune, Wallpaper and more.

In 2019, she has been part of the jury of Frame awards in Amsterdam and she curated a show in Milan called Land, about human, nature and “terra”.

In 2020, Ottobri founded VGO Associates, a gallery exploring the interactions of objects and spaces in daily life. The gallery works on projects across art and architecture, including collaborations with design brands.

== Personal life ==
She was born in Florence, Italy and lives between the South of France and Italy with her boyfriend Lapo Becherini in their 18th year of the relationship.
