= Jennifer Guidi =

American painter

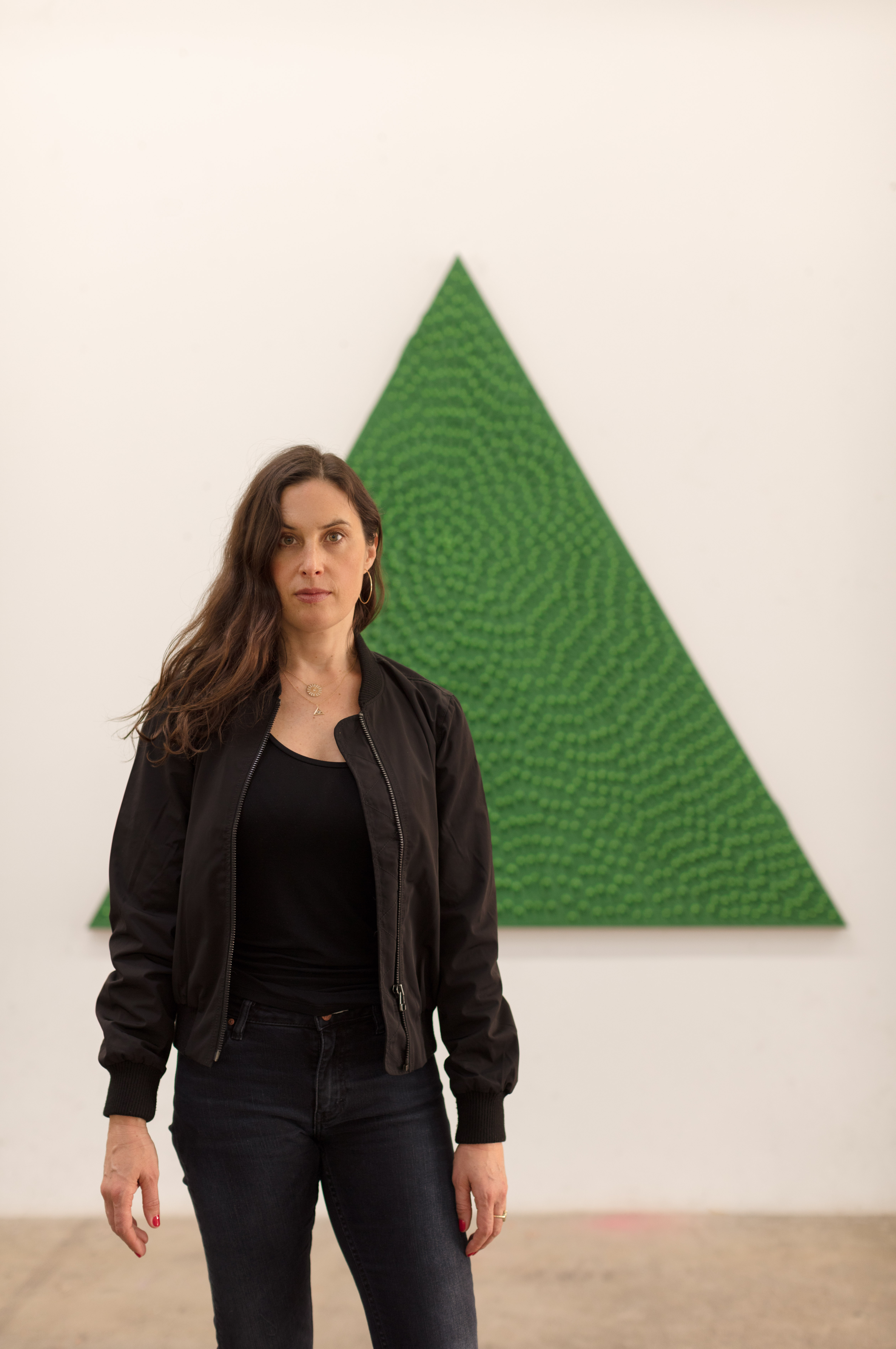

Jennifer Guidi (born 1972) is an American painter.

== Early life and education ==
Guidi enrolled at Boston University, where she studied painting and printmaking, She primarily painted portraits, both of herself and of friends. After receiving her BFA in 1994, Guidi earned an MFA from the School of the Art Institute of Chicago in 1998 and relocated to Los Angeles in 2001.

== Career ==
In 2005, she staged her first solo exhibition at ACME. in Los Angeles, where she presented eleven intimately-scaled oil paintings on linen that drew comparisons to the paintings of Sam Francis and Fairfield Porter. At this time, Guidi was making representational paintings of landscapes, plants, and insects.

During a 2012 trip to Marrakesh, she became fascinated by the rich patterning of Moroccan rugs, specifically the intricate stitching found on their rarely seen verso sides. She then began to paint from photographs of these woven surfaces, ultimately producing a series of abstract oil and sand paintings titled Field Paintings, which debuted in a solo exhibition at LAXART in 2014. Featuring rows of minuscule, tactile impressions, these paintings marked a shift from representation to abstraction, as well as the introduction of sand into Guidi's work.

In 2017, Guidi presented her first solo museum exhibition at the Villa Croce Museum of Contemporary Art in Genoa, Italy. The exhibition consisted of large-scale sand and acrylic paintings, which were painted in the seven colors of the light spectrum and occupied the frescoed interior walls of the neoclassical Italian villa. Methodically produced meditations on light and color, Guidi's most recent paintings feature mandala-like compositions and have been compared to the works of Agnes Martin, Georgia O'Keeffe, and the Light and Space artists.

Guidi's work can be found in the public collections of the Los Angeles County Museum of Art, Museum of Contemporary Art, Los Angeles, San Francisco Museum of Modern Art, Dallas Museum of Art, Hammer Museum, Solomon R. Guggenheim Museum, Marciano Art Foundation, and the Rubell Family Collection.

== Museum exhibitions ==
- 2023: “Jennifer Guidi. And so it is.,” Orange County Museum of Art, Costa Mesa, California
- 2022: “Jennifer Guidi. Full Moon,” Long Museum, West Bund, Shanghai, China
- 2017: “Visible Light / Luce Visible,” Museo d’Arte Contemporanea Villa Croce, Genoa, Italy

== Solo exhibitions ==
- 2025 “Points on Your Journey,” Massimo De Carlo, Milan
- 2024 "Rituals", Gagosian Gallery, New York
- 2023 "And so it is.", Orange County Museum of Art, Costa Mesa, CA

"Mountain Range", Chateau La Coste, Le Puy-Sainte-Reparade, France

- 2022 "In the Heart of the Sun", David Kordansky Gallery, Los Angeles

"Full Moon", Long Museum (West Bund), Shanghai

- 2021 "Infinite Waves", Frieze, Gagosian Gallery, London

"Points of Harmony", Massimo De Carlo, Pièce Unique, Paris

- 2020 "Gemini", Gagosian, New York, NY
- 2019 "11:11", Foire Internationale d'Art Contemporain (FIAC), David Kordansky Gallery, Grand Palais, Paris

"Eclipse", Massimo De Carlo Milan, Belgioioso, Italy

- 2018 "Heliocentric", Gagosian Gallery, Hong Kong
- 2017 "More Life", David Kordansky Gallery, Los Angeles CA

"Visible Light / Luce Visibile", Museo d'arte Contemporanea Villa Croce, Genoa Italy

"San Fernando", Almine Rech Gallery, New York NY

- 2016 "Radiant", Massimo De Carlo, London UK

"Pink Sand", Harper's Apartment, New York NY

- 2014 "Field Paintings", LAXART, Los Angeles CA

"Field Paintings:, Nathalie Karg Gallery, New York NY

- 2006 "The Sunshine Threw His Hat Away", ACME., Los Angeles CA
- 2005 "Paintings", ACME., Los Angeles CA
