= Piccarda Donati =

13th-century Italian noblewoman

Piccarda Donati (Florence, mid-thirteenth century – Florence, end of the thirteenth century) was a medieval noblewoman and a religious woman from Florence, Italy. She appears as a character in Dante Alighieri's Divine Comedy.

== Biography ==
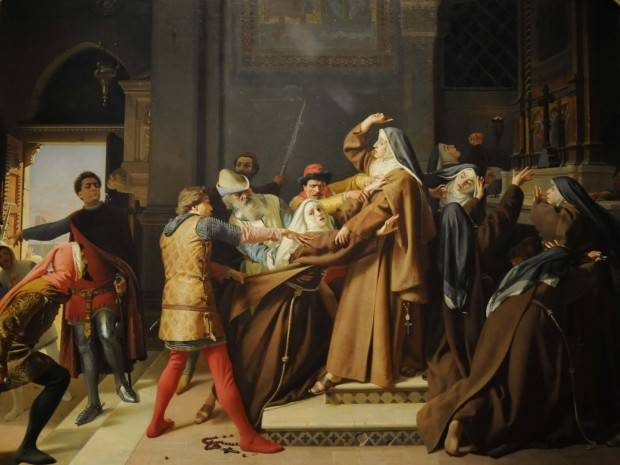
Raffaello Sorbi, The Abduction of Piccarda Donati from the Convent of Monticelli (1866)

Piccarda was born into the Donati family, the prominent Florentine family leading the Black Guelph faction. She was the sister of Corso Donati, leader of the Black Guelphs, and Forese Donati, known for his friendship with Dante. It is also likely that Dante and Piccarda knew each other well.

At a young age, Piccarda fled her home in order to become a nun. She joined the Order of Saint Clare (also known as the "Poor Clares") in the convent of Santa Maria di Monticelli, located in the vicinities of Florence. About a year later, Piccarda was forcibly removed from the monastery by Corso Donati, who forced her to marry Rossellino della Tosa for political interests, namely, to strengthen the alliance of the Donati with the Della Tosa family.

Some sources claim that she died of a sudden illness akin to leprosy before the consummation of her marriage, but this claim is now widely considered to be a legend.

== In Dante's Divine Comedy ==
=== Purgatorio ===
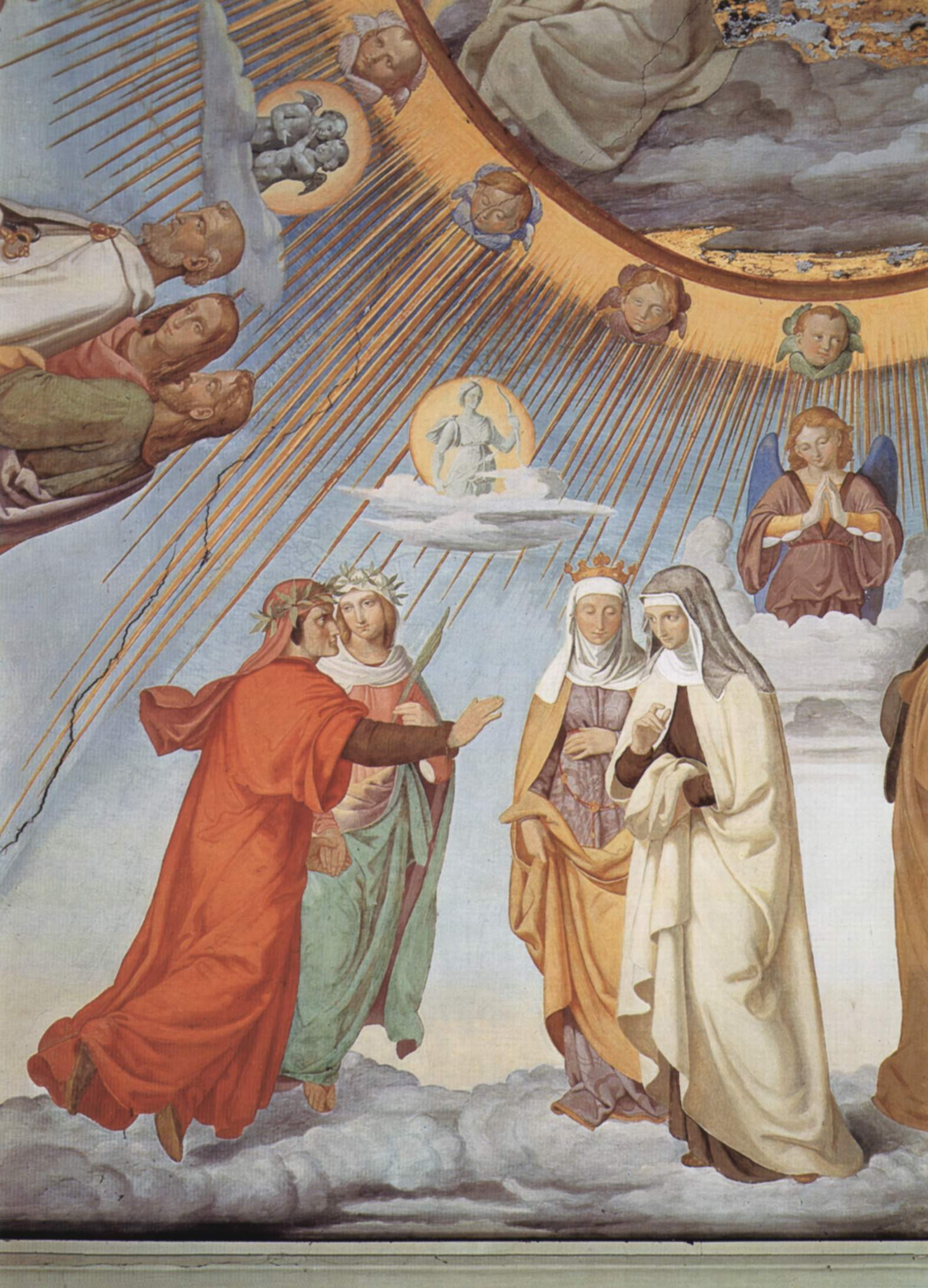
Dante and Beatrice speak to Piccarda and Constance in Paradiso, Canto 3.

In Dante's Divine Comedy, we first learn about Piccarda during Dante's encounter with her brother, Forese Donati in Purgatorio 23. Here, Dante asks Forese in what realm of the Christian afterlife Piccarda can be found, and Forese promptly replies that Piccarda is in Heaven. In this exchange, both characters praise Piccarda as a paragon of beauty and virtue.

=== Paradiso ===
Piccarda is the first character Dante encounters in Paradise together with Constance of Hauteville, the mother of Emperor Frederick II, who was believed to have been similarly forced out of a convent to marry Emperor Henry VI of Hohenstaufen. This encounter takes place in Paradiso 3, in the Heaven of the Moon, the lowest sphere of Heaven that houses souls that were inconstant and not firm in their vocation. Here, Piccarda explains to Dante that her placement is due to "vows neglected and, in part, no longer valid." In her acquiescence to Corso's wishes for her to marry, though forced, Piccarda is shown as having neglected her vows to God.

Through Dante's encounter with Piccarda, readers of Paradiso first begin to learn about the nature of Heaven. For example, we learn that souls in Heaven become much more beautiful than they were on Earth; in fact, it takes Dante a while to actually recognize Piccarda as the woman he knew. In higher spheres, souls become so beautiful they cease to resemble their earthly selves. Piccarda is the only person Dante will recognize, unaided, in Heaven.

Dante asks Piccarda if she does not long to be placed higher in Heaven. Her answer (she does not wish to be higher) highlights another important point: according to Piccarda, blessed souls long only for what they have, and so their wills are entirely in agreement with that of God. If they desired to be higher in heaven, then their wish would differ from God's will, which is an impossibility. Though they know there are others in higher spheres of Heaven, they rejoice in their placement.

=== Interpretations of Dante's Piccarda ===
As with other prominent female characters in the Divine Comedy such as Francesca da Rimini and Pia de' Tolomei, Piccarda is a woman whose life, freedom, and personal choices were affected by the political interests of their close family members, whether by kin or marriage. Piccarda's life and placement in Paradise plays an important role when discussing freedom, specifically in the context of civic versus spiritual responsibility. This is best displayed by Beatrice's explanation which essentially states that when force or forceful actions affects a person's physical body, it also affects their will by extension.

When asked by Dante about the logic behind Piccarda's lesser state of beatitude, Beatrice makes a distinction between "absolute will" and "contaminated will." Piccarda is an example of absolute will. Her will to keep her vow to God was so intense that it can be described as an "innermost will". This means that, internally, she remained pure. Another way to look at Piccarda's representation in Paradiso is that her vow was transferred from her head to her heart, thus actually preserving its purity. According to Dante, she serves as a case study to illustrate the strength it takes to ensure that a person's will is not contaminated by outside interferences and the importance of choosing God above all.
