= Carlo Marenco =

Italian dramatist

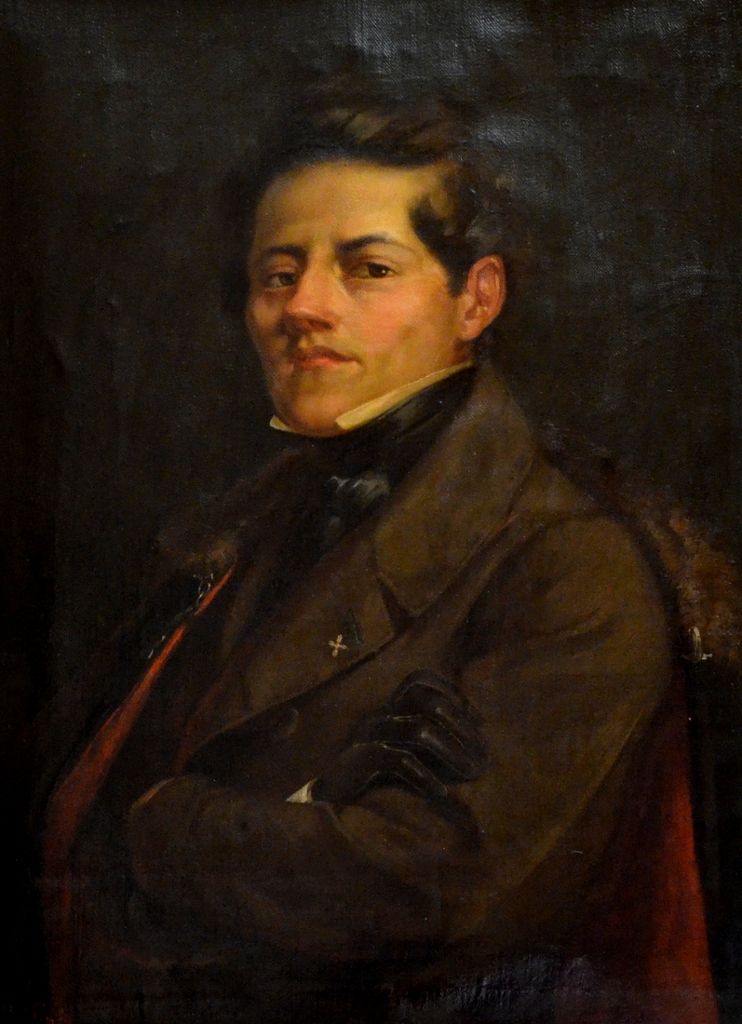
Carlo Marenco

Carlo Marenco (1800–1846) was an Italian dramatist.

== Life ==
Marenco was born in Cassolnuovo, Lombardy. After studying law he devoted himself to writing. In order to generate income, Marenco applied for and obtained a public post connected with the Treasury Department of Savona. He died at Savona.

== Works ==
As a writer, Carlo Marenco belongs to the Romantic school with an elegant style and sentimental tragedies. He rejected the unity of time in his plays which adds to the ample plot development and characters being considered to be as lifelike as possible.

For some of his tragedies he derived inspiration from Dante, as in the "Pia de' Tolomei", the "Corso Donati", and the "Conte Ugolino". In the "Pia" there are traits of the Roman Lucretia and Susannah of the Bible, combined with characteristics of a Dante-esque figure.

Other plays bearing upon more or less historical personages include "Arnoldo da Brescia", "Berengario", "Arrigo di Svevia", and "Corradino".
