= Bartolomeo Sestini =

Italian poet (1792-1822)

Bartolomeo Sestini (14 October 1792– 11 November 1822) was an Italian poet.

== Life ==
Born in the Santomato district of Pistoia, he was the son of Maddalena Biagini and Francesco Sestini. His father tried to make his son study geometry, but from his youth he was more interested in poetry. He briefly studied under the painter Giuseppe Vannucci. At the age of 13, he was sent to Florence to study perspective under Castagnoli, mathematics under Ferroni, and architecture (the profession of his father) under Silvestri. But again, he drifted towards poetry, and joined circles that included Foscolo, Sgricci, and Benedetti.

Whilst he was with his fiancee in the countryside she was struck by lightning and killed - this inspired his poem Amori campestri, which was published. He later met Ugo Foscolo in villa Belvedere in Florence. After travelling around the cities of Italy, attracted by the story of Pia de' Tolomei in Dante's Divine Comedy, he published a verse novella on the topic entitled Pia de' Tolomei in Ravenna. In its preface he wrote "I publish la Pia, a subject dear to anyone who has read the four mysterious lines in the Divine Comedy".

During the Napoleonic invasions he traveled to Ancona, then Rome and ultimately to Naples. In 1819, while in Palermo, he was suspected of joining the Carbonari and so fled to Paris. While in jail he wrote poems titled Canzone all patria and La prigionia die Torquatto Tasso. he was released and traveled back to Tuscany. In 1821, while in Viterbo, he wroteGuido di Monforte Conte di Montefeltro and a dramatic work: Il trionfo di Santa Rosa dopo l'esilio. In 1822, he went into exile in Paris, where he would die young. The first edition of Pia was published in Ravenna under the pseudonym Giorgio Serighi three years after his death.

== External links (in Italian) ==
- Enciclopedia treccani, Sestini, Bartolomeo
- Bartolomeo Sestini, Pia de' Tolomei, Sonzogno, Milano, 1887; Borroni e Scotti, Milano, 1848
