= Guglielmino degli Ubertini =

Italian condottiero and bishop

Most Reverend Guglielmino degli Ubertini
- Bishop of Arezzo-Cortona-Sansepolcro
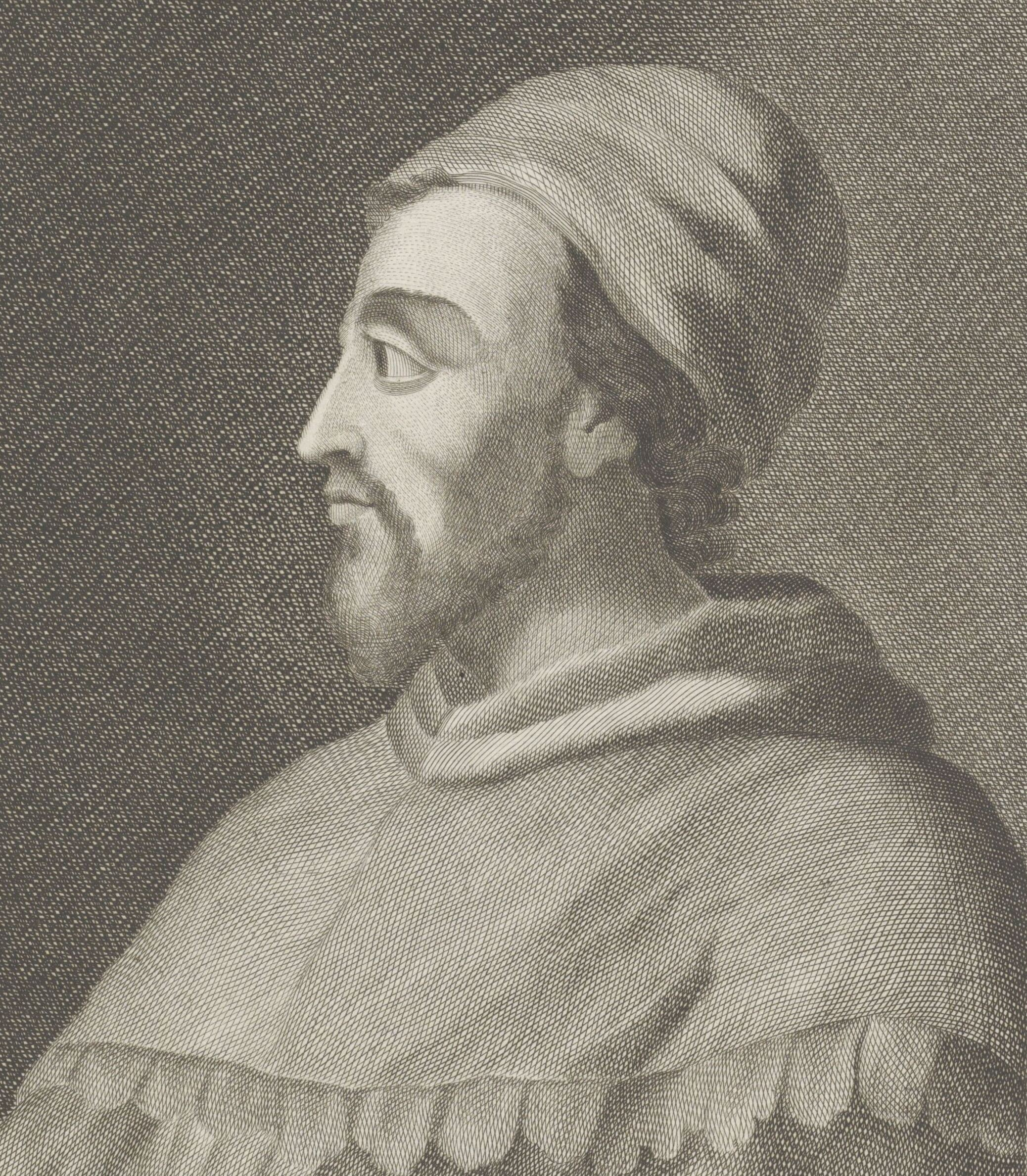
- Church: Catholic Church
- Diocese: Diocese of Arezzo-Cortona-Sansepolcro
- In office: 1248-1289
- Predecessor: Marcellus Pete
- Successor: Ildebrandino dei conti Guidi

Personal details
- Born: c. 1219 Arezzo, Italy
- Died: 11 June 1289 (aged 69–70) Campaldino, Italy

Guglielmo or Guglielmino Ubertini (c. 1219 – Campaldino, 11 June 1289) was an Italian condottiero (military leader) and bishop of Arezzo. He died in the Battle of Campaldino, leading a force of mainly Aretine Ghibellines fighting against a victorious Guelf army from Florence, Lucca, Siena, Pistoia and Prato. Dante Alighieri putatively fought with the victorious army.

Guglielmo, with the support of the Holy Roman Emperor Frederick II, was confirmed bishop in 1256 by pope Alexander IV. With the support of warriors from Spoleto and the Marche, he had defeated the Sienese at Pieve del Toppo in 1288. Controversy exists as to how willing Guglielmo was to battle the Guelph army at Campaldino. Some sources state he was forced onto the battlefield after attempting to negotiate with Florence. Others hold that Guglielmo, while urged to save himself at Campaldino, refused to leave the battlefield alive. His helmet and sword were displayed for many years in the church of San Giovanni in Florence.
