= Forese Donati =

Italian nobleman and poet (died 1296)

Forese Donati was an Italian nobleman born in Florence, associated with the Guelphs. He was the son of Simone di Forese and Tessa, and the brother of Corso and Piccarda Donati. He was married to Nella Donati and had one daughter, Ghita. He was known as a childhood friend of Dante Alighieri. He died in 1296, in Firenze.

In their youth, Forese and Dante exchanged a series of playful sonnets called terzanelle, which take the form of a series of exchanged insults.

== Role in the Works of Dante Alighieri ==
=== Forese in Dante's Divine Comedy ===
In Purgatorio 23 of the Divine Comedy, Dante encounters Forese on the sixth terrace of Purgatory, where the gluttonous are punished by being forced to starve for food and drink while passing past them, similar to the punishment of Tantalus. Dante barely recognizes Forese's emaciated face, and his friend's state causes him great grief. He expresses surprise at Forese's salvation - he had died five years before - and at his quick advancement through the terraces of Purgatory. Forese praises his wife Nella, whose prayers have allowed him to pass quickly through Purgatory, and in contrast maligns the provocatively-dressed Florentine women and predicts that more restrictive dress codes will soon be enforced in Florence, in a manner reminiscent of Christian moral invective of the fourth-century Church Fathers.

Curious to know how Dante came to be here, Forese asks after Dante's life since his own death. Dante refers to their friendship and their joint indulgence in sinful behavior when they were younger, probably including the composition of the vulgar and insulting tenzone detailed below. Dante tells Forese of his journey through Hell and Purgatory, accompanied by Virgil. He asks about Forese's sister Piccarda, and Forese informs Dante that Piccarda is now in Heaven. He goes on to identify other prominent personages on the terrace of the gluttons. Before leaving Dante, Forese predicts the coming death of his brother Corso and his descent into Hell.

=== Forese in Dante's Tenzone with Forese ===
In Dante's tenzone with Forese, he accuses Forese of being sexually inadequate, as well as economically troubled. Forese is described as being associated with his immoral family name, who are known to be infamous for their ways with money. There is an excerpt from Nella's mother in the tenzone in which she describes how upset she is that Forese has wasted Nella's dowry. His wife is described as being constantly cold, since Forese cannot please her in bed.
