= Battle of Campaldino =

Battle between Guelphs and Ghibellines (June 11, 1289)

- Part of the wars of the Guelphs and Ghibellines
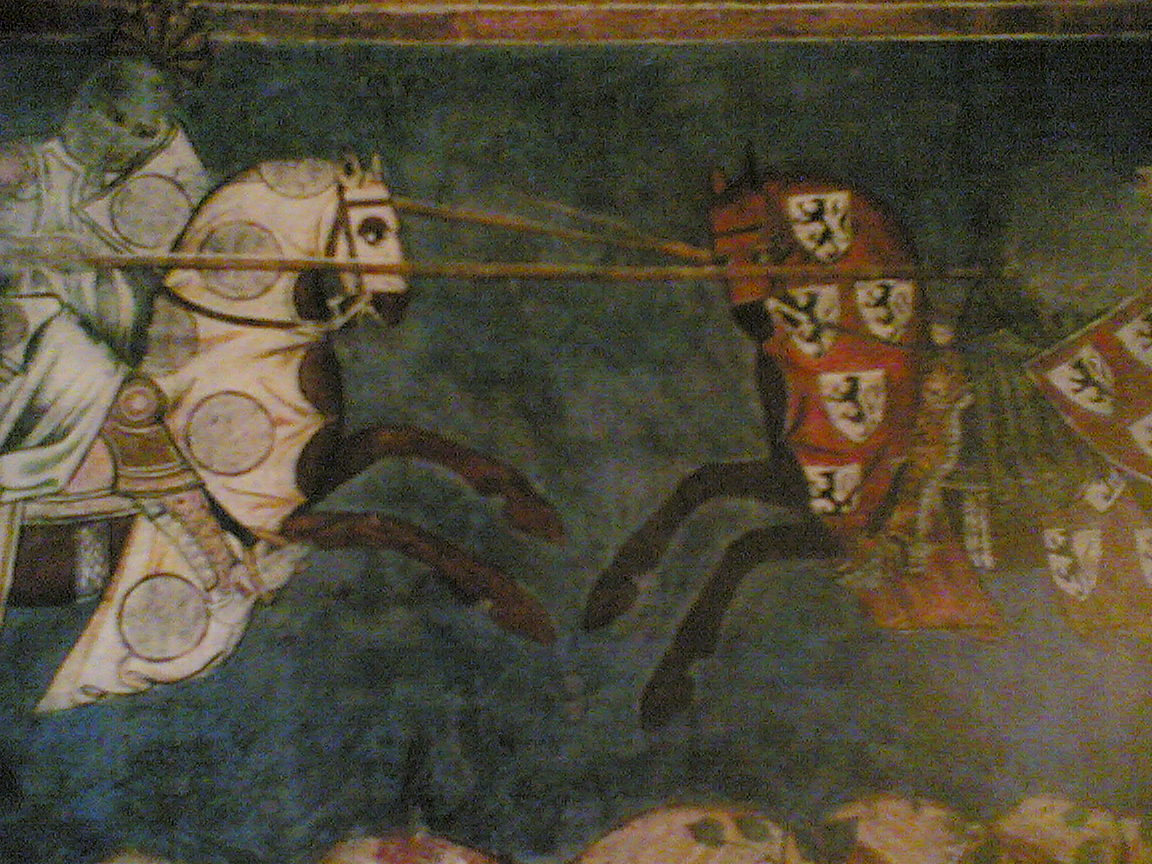
- Fresco in San Gimignano from 1292
Date	11 June 1289
Location	Campaldino, Tuscany present-day Italy
Result	Decisive Guelph victory

Belligerents
Guelphs: Florence; Forces of Charles II of Naples; Aretine exiles; Tuscan Guelph cities (Note: Tuscan Guelph cities known to have contributed forces for the army at Campaldino include Bologna, Pistoia, Lucca, San Gimignano, San Miniato, Siena, Volterra, and other small towns.); Guelphs from Romagna	Ghibellines: Arezzo; Florentine exiles; Ghibellines from Tuscany and Romagna

Commanders and leaders
Amerigo di Narbona; Guillaume da Durfort †; Corso Donati; Vieri de' Cerchi; Barone de Mangiadori	Guglielmo Ubertini †; Bonconte da Montefeltro †; Guido Novello Guidi

Strength
c. 12,000: 10,000 infantry; 2,000 cavalry	10,000 infantry 800 cavalry

Casualties and losses
300 killed, many wounded	1,700 killed, many wounded, 2,000 captured

The Battle of Campaldino was fought between the Guelphs and Ghibellines on 11 June 1289. Mixed bands of pro-papal Guelph forces of Florence and allies, Pistoia, Lucca, Siena, and Prato, all loosely commanded by the paid condottiero Amerigo di Narbona with his own professional following, met a Ghibelline force from Arezzo including the perhaps reluctant bishop, Guglielmino degli Ubertini, in the plain of Campaldino, which leads from Pratovecchio to Poppi, part of the Tuscan countryside along the upper Arno called the Casentino. One of the combatants on the Guelph side was Dante Alighieri, twenty-four years old at the time.

== Background ==
Later, in the mid-14th century, Giovanni Villani recorded the long-remembered details— as Florentines remembered them— in his chronicle, though the casus belli he offers are merely conventional "outrages" on the part of Arezzo; the elaborately staged raid and fight led by aristocrats on both sides sounds like stylized gang warfare, though carried out, according to Villani, under the battle standard of the absent Charles, the Angevine King of Naples. The immediate cause of the battle were reports that the Guelphs were ravaging the places of Conte Guido Novello, who was podestà of Arezzo, and, worse, threatening the fortified place called Bibbiena Civitella. This led to an Aretine force being quickly assembled and marching out to counter the threat. It was reported by Villani that a plot had been intercepted at Arezzo, by which the bishop agreed to give over to the Florentines Bibbiena Civitella, and all the villages of his see, in return for a life annuity of 5,000 golden florins a year, guaranteed by the bank of the Cerchi family. The plot was uncovered by his nephew Guglielmo de' Pazzi, and they hustled the bishop onto his horse and brought him to the battlefield, where they left him dead among the slain of the battle and its aftermath: Guglielmino de' Pazzi in Valdarno and Bonconte, the son of Guido I da Montefeltro.

== Opposing forces ==
=== Guelph army ===
The Guelphs had the numerical advantage in the battle, with about 12,000 combatants. Most of these troops had been raised by Florence, and were generally well-equipped due to their hometown's wealth. Florence was well known at the time as a producer of highly regarded weapons and armour, and its troops probably had better weaponry than the Ghibellines. The Florentines were reinforced by other Tuscan Guelphs, including Bologna, Pistoia, Lucca, San Gimignano, San Miniato, Siena, Volterra, and other small towns. Furthermore, small contingents of Guelphs from Romagna and Guelph exiles from Arezzo fought at Campaldino. The Guelph cavalry lacked combat experience and suffered from indiscipline, so that the about 10,000 infantrymen formed the actual core of the Guelph army. At least half of the infantry were better-trained specialists who operated as spearmen, pavisiers, crossbowmen, and archers, while the rest consisted of less effective, but still reliable militiamen. In general, the Italian Guelph troops were less experienced than the Ghibellines. In addition to these local forces, about 400 French knights of Amerigo di Narbona's retinue fought at Campaldino; they were experienced veterans who were highly regarded for their combat prowess.

The Guelph army was officially led by Amerigo di Narbona, who served as Charles II of Naples's representative for Tuscany and had been appointed as a compromise, since the Italian Guelphs could not agree on one of their own to lead them. Though he probably possessed some combat experience and proved to be a competent commander, Amerigo's relative lack of military skill, youth, and the fact that he did not speak Tuscan Italian meant that his command of the army was mostly nominal. As a result, the de facto leader of the army was a Carcassonne knight in Amerigo's retinue, Guillaume da Durfort, a highly experienced veteran of several wars. Under these two, several Italian Guelphs served as sub-commanders, with the most notable being Corso Donati, Vieri de' Cerchi, and the Barone de Mangiadori.

=== Ghibelline army ===
The Ghibelline army was of similar size, but differed drastically in its composition from the Guelph force. Unlike their opponents, the Ghibellines relied less on ad hoc city militias and were instead mostly composed of feudal lords and their retinues, who were generally much better trained and more experienced than their opponents. The Ghibelline cavalry and infantry were thus regarded as the better fighters compared with their Guelph opponents, with Villani describing them as "the flower of the Ghibellines of Tuscany, of the March, and of the Duchy, and of Romagna" who were "practised in weapons and in war". The Ghibelline infantry consisted of fewer spearmen, pavisiers, and crossbowmen than its Guelph counterparts; instead, it relied on offensive close-quarters combat with swords and bucklers. Despite this, many Ghibelline fiefs were rather poor, and both their cavalry and infantry were probably less well equipped than the Guelphs.

The Ghibelline army had three main commanders: First, Guglielmo Ubertini who had served for forty years as the bishop of Arezzo by the time of the battle. "A man of the sword as much as of the pen", Ubertini had proven to be a capable, ruthless, and brave military commander during several conflicts before 1289, though his strategic acumen was impeded by his interest in defending the possessions of his family at any cost. This greatly influenced his decision to seek battle at Campaldino, despite having been advised against it. The second most important Ghibelline commander was Guido Novello Guidi, the Count of Poppi, a veteran of several campaigns, and long-time leader of the Ghibelline cause in Tuscany. A shrewd and opportunistic politician and military leader, he was one of the few Ghibelline commanders to survive the Battle of Campaldino. Finally, there was Bonconte da Montefeltro, an accomplished strategist and tactician who had led the Ghibellines to a "brilliant" victory at Pieve al Toppo in 1288. Montefeltro was one of those who argued against seeking battle at Campaldino, but nevertheless drew up a good battle-plan when forced to do so.

== Battle ==
=== Deployment ===
The Florentines deployed an advance guard of cavalry, behind which, in the centre of their line stood the bulk of their cavalry. On each wing they placed their infantry, slightly forward so the line was crescent shaped. Behind this force, they drew up their baggage and, behind that, a reserve of infantry and cavalry. The Aretines drew up in four lines; the first, second, and fourth of cavalry, the third of infantry.

=== Course of the battle ===
The Aretines attacked with their first three lines, scattering the Florentine advanced guard and pushing back the main body towards the wagons. However, they now came under crossfire from the flanking infantry. The Florentine reserve now made a flanking attack, trapping the Aretines. According to Villani, Corso Donati, podestà of Pistoia, though under orders to stand ready in reserve, shouted “If we lose, I will die in the battle with my fellow citizens; and if we conquer, let him that will, come to us at Pistoia to exact the penalty!” and charged the Aretine flank, helping break up the lines and win the day for the Guelphs. Instead of coming to the rescue, the Aretine reserve fled. Aretine casualties were high. Ploughing the Campaldino plain used to turn up human remains and bones as recently as eighty years ago.

The twenty-four year old poet Dante Alighieri who was present in the battle mentioned that 1,700 Ghibellines were killed and 2,000 were then taken prisoner. The Ghibelline leader was 'stabbed in the throat', and he died after falling into a river.

== Result ==
The Battle of Campaldino secured Guelph dominance in Florence, though internecine fighting among the Whites and Blacks among the Florentine Guelphs resulted in civic disturbances and the exile of many, including Dante (a member of the Whites, the faction more opposed to papal power).

== Bibliography ==
- DeVries, Kelly; Capponi, Niccolò (2018). Marcus Cowper (ed.). Campaldino 1289. The battle that made Dante. Oxford: Osprey Publishing. ISBN 978-1472831286.
