= Tesauro =

Tesauro is a surname, and may refer to:

- Bernardo Tesauro, Italian painter
- Emanuele Tesauro (1592–1675) rhetorician, dramatist, poet, and historian from Turin
- Filippo Tesauro, Italian painter
- Gerald Tesauro, American computer scientist
- Giuseppe Tesauro (1942–2021), Italian judge
- Michelle Tesauro, American reality show contestant
- Raimo Epifanio Tesauro, Italian painter
