= Maestà of Santa Maria dei Servi =

C. 1280 painting by Cimabue

- Maestà di Santa Maria dei Servi (Italian)
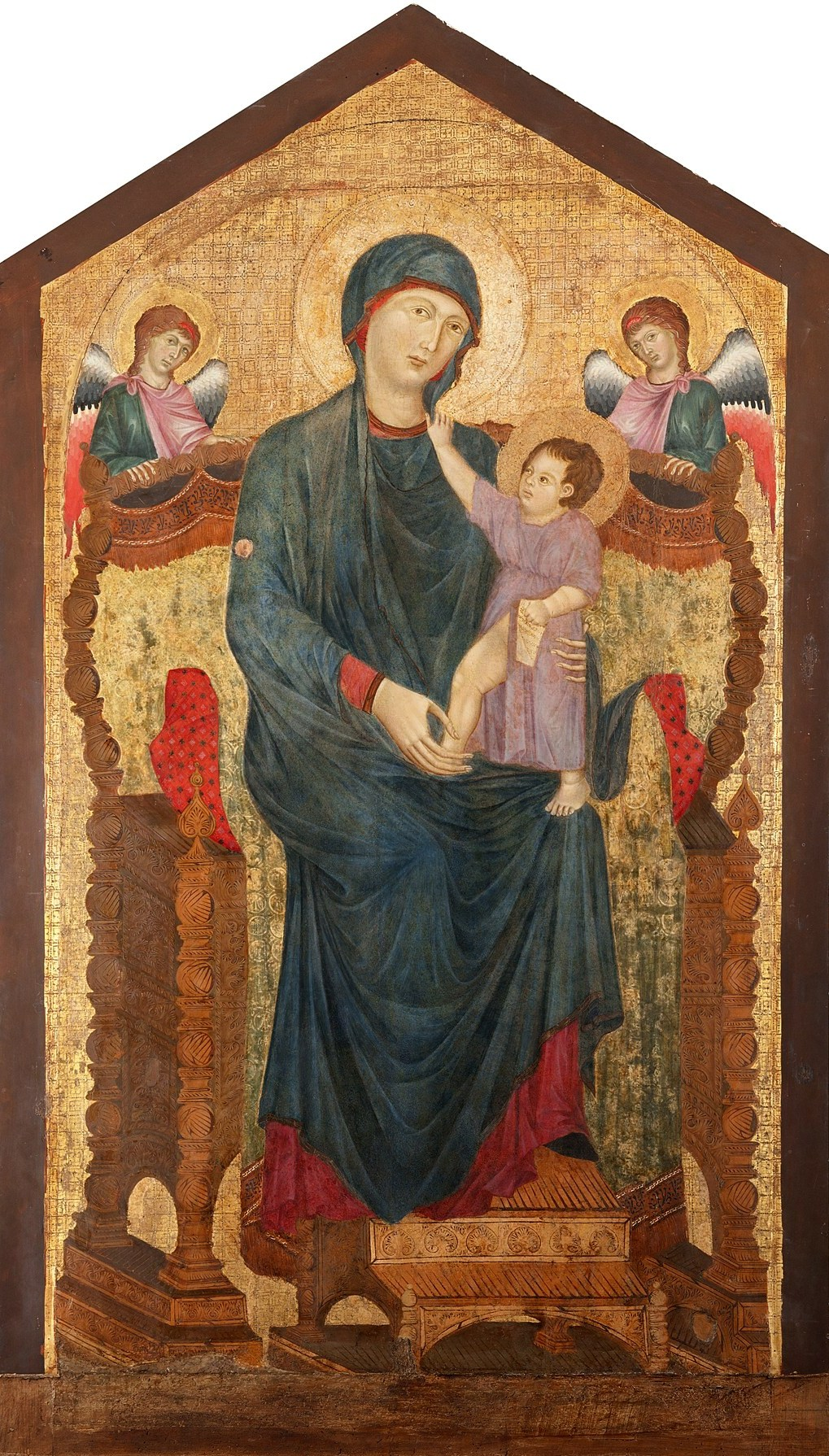
- Artist: Cimabue
- Year: 1280
- Medium: Tempera on wood
- Dimensions: 218 cm × 118 cm (86 in × 46 in)
- Location: Santa Maria dei Servi, Bologna

The Maestà of Santa Maria dei Servi is a tempera and gold on panel painting by Cimabue or his workshop, dating to c.1280-1285, between his Louvre Maestà (c.1280) on the one hand and the Assisi frescoes (1288–1292) and the Santa Trinita Maestà (c.1290-1300) on the other. It is named after the church of Santa Maria dei Servi in Bologna, where it hangs.

It was later repainted and has a fake inscription as well as several candle burns. Enrico Podio restored it in 1936-1937 and Ottorino Nonfarmale in 1977. As with many other paintings it reproduces Islamic textiles, in particular the thin strip of fabric covering the upper edge of the throne, with a pseudo-Arabic inscription whose "characters" are very similar to those on a Syrian ceramic of the same date now in the Victoria and Albert Museum.

Until 1885 it was considered as being by an anonymous artist. Thode, Strzygowsi, Zimmermann, Aubert, Suida, Weigelt, Offner, Chiappelli, Supino, Venturi, Toesca, Berenson, Sandberg Vavalà, Lavagnino, Becherucci, Volpe, Venturoli, Tartuferi and Bellosi all argued that it was a wholly autograph work by Cimabue, though Sirén and Coletti were more doubtful. Salmi, Longhi, Ragghianti, Samek, Ludovici, Battisti, Bologna and Marques accept Cimabue's authorship but argued for heavy participation by his workshop, whilst Nicholson, Sinibaldi, Savini and Lazarev argued it was a wholly studio work. In 1949 Edward Garrison attributed it to a "Bolognese master influenced by Cimabue and Frey, Wackernagel, Van Marle, Mather, D'Ancona, Sindona and Soulier exclude it from the list of Cimabue's works.

== Bibliography ==
- (in Italian) Eugenio Battisti, Cimabue, Milano, Istituto Editoriale Italiano, 1963.
- (in Italian) Enio Sindona, Cimabue e il momento figurativo pregiottesco, Rizzoli Editore, Milano, 1975.
- (in Italian) Luciano Bellosi, Cimabue, Milano, Federico Motta Editore, 2004. ISBN 88-7179-452-4
