= Tommaso de Stefani =

Italian painter

Tommaso de Stefani (c. 1250 – c. 1310) was an Italian painter of the Renaissance period, active mainly in Naples.

== Biography ==
The details of painters of this period are nebulous and often confusing. In the absence of details, often Tuscan painters of the period with similar names are recruited, perhaps erroneously, by later art historians as active in Naples. For example, this painter at times is confused for Tommaso di Stefano (Giottino). The exact relationships of mentor/teacher and pupil/follower are often nebulous.

Bernardo de Dominici claimed that Charles I of Naples recruited Cimabue in Florence after he saw the accomplishments of the painter. Once the Duomo of Naples was completed in 1272, Stefani was commissioned to decorate the tribune and major chapels, including the chapel of Minutoli where some frescoes depicting the Passion of Christ still exist . Many of these have undergone major restorations in later centuries including by Filippo Tesauro in the 14th century. A painted crucifix in the church of San Domenico Maggiore has been attributed to Stefani. One of his pupils was Filippo Tesauro. Tomasso's brother, Pietro de Stefani was a sculptor and architect in Naples.
