= Saint Francis Receiving the Stigmata (Giotto) =

Painting by Giotto

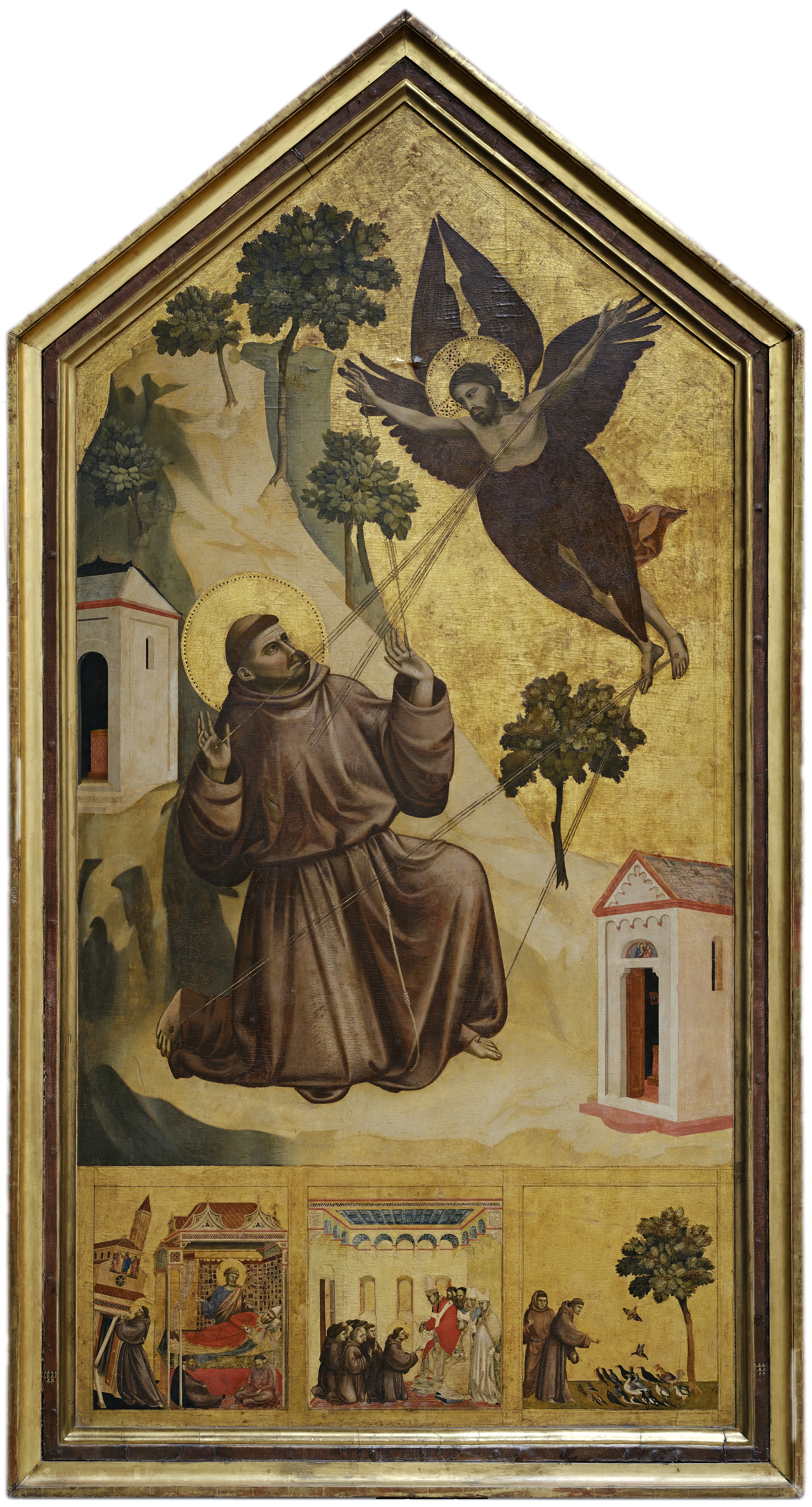
- Artist: Giotto
- Year: c. 1295–1300
- Medium: Tempera and gold on panel
- Dimensions: 313 cm × 163 cm (123 in × 64 in)
- Location: Louvre, Paris

Saint Francis Receiving the Stigmata is a panel painting in tempera by the Italian artist Giotto, painted around 1295–1300 for the Church of Saint Francis in Pisa and it is now in the Musée du Louvre in Paris. It shows an episode from the life of Saint Francis of Assisi together with three scenes from his life in a predella below, and is 314 cm high (to the top of the triangle) by 162 cm wide. It is signed, or at least inscribed, OPUS IOCTI FLORENTINI ("the work of Florentine Giotto") in painted letters on a flat and now dark strip of the frame at the bottom, the inscription centred below the middle predella scene.

== History ==
In his Le Vite, Giorgio Vasari mentions the work in a transept chapel of the church of San Francesco in Pisa. Despite having been disputed, the work is now generally recognized to be by Giotto, being also signed; it has been dated from shortly before or after the Stories of St. Francis in Assisi, around 1295–1300.

In 1813 it became property of the Louvre (inv. 309), as part of the Napoleonic looting of art in Italy, together with Cimabue's Maestà, also from San Francesco. Jean Baptise Henraux took it, due to the interest of Dominique Vivant Denon, who was particularly passionate about "primitive" Italian paintings. It was put on display in the Louvre in 1814. After the restitution of artworks seized at the time, the panel was one of the paintings that remained in France.

== Description ==
=== Stigmatisation ===
The work has a rectangular shape in the lower part, ending with a triangular cusp, and has a gold ground. It depicts St. Francis receiving the stigmata during his prayer on Mount Alverno fros a mix of newer and old elements, the latter including the very generic mountains and the lack of proportions in the landscape elements. The chapels in the mount show the attempt to draw them according to geometrical perspective. Francis' face is characterized by a strong use of chiaroscuro.

The scene was innovative as it abandoned the Italo-Byzantine tradition of inexpressive figures as the center of paintings in favor of a moment of action as the principal subject (compare the works of Bonaventura Berlinghieri and the Master of San Francesco Bardi, or Giotto's own Badia Polyptych).

At the left and right corners, the heraldry of the Ughi or Cinquini family is visible.

=== Predella ===
The predella shows three scenes from the saint's life: The Dream of Pope Innocent III, The Approval of the Franciscan Rule, and The Sermon to the Birds. These depictions are also generally attributed to Giotto, and are strongly tied to the frescoes of Assisi.

The Dream shows the collapse of Laterano, with its church tilting and a column just breaking. The presence of Saint Peter to indicate that the Pope is sleeping during the vision was an innovative technique at the time. The Approval, on the other hand, is very similar to Giotto's fresco in the Basilica of Saint Francis of Assisi Innocence III Confirms the Franciscan Order and is placed in a similar room with arches and shelves to create perspective. The Sermon stands out for its simplicity and abstraction, thanks to its gold background without decorations.

In general, the style of the scenes shows greater Gothic elegance than the three stories of the Fransciscan cycle in Giotto's Assisi frescoes and serves as a point of comparison to Giottesque artists such as the Master of St Cecilia.

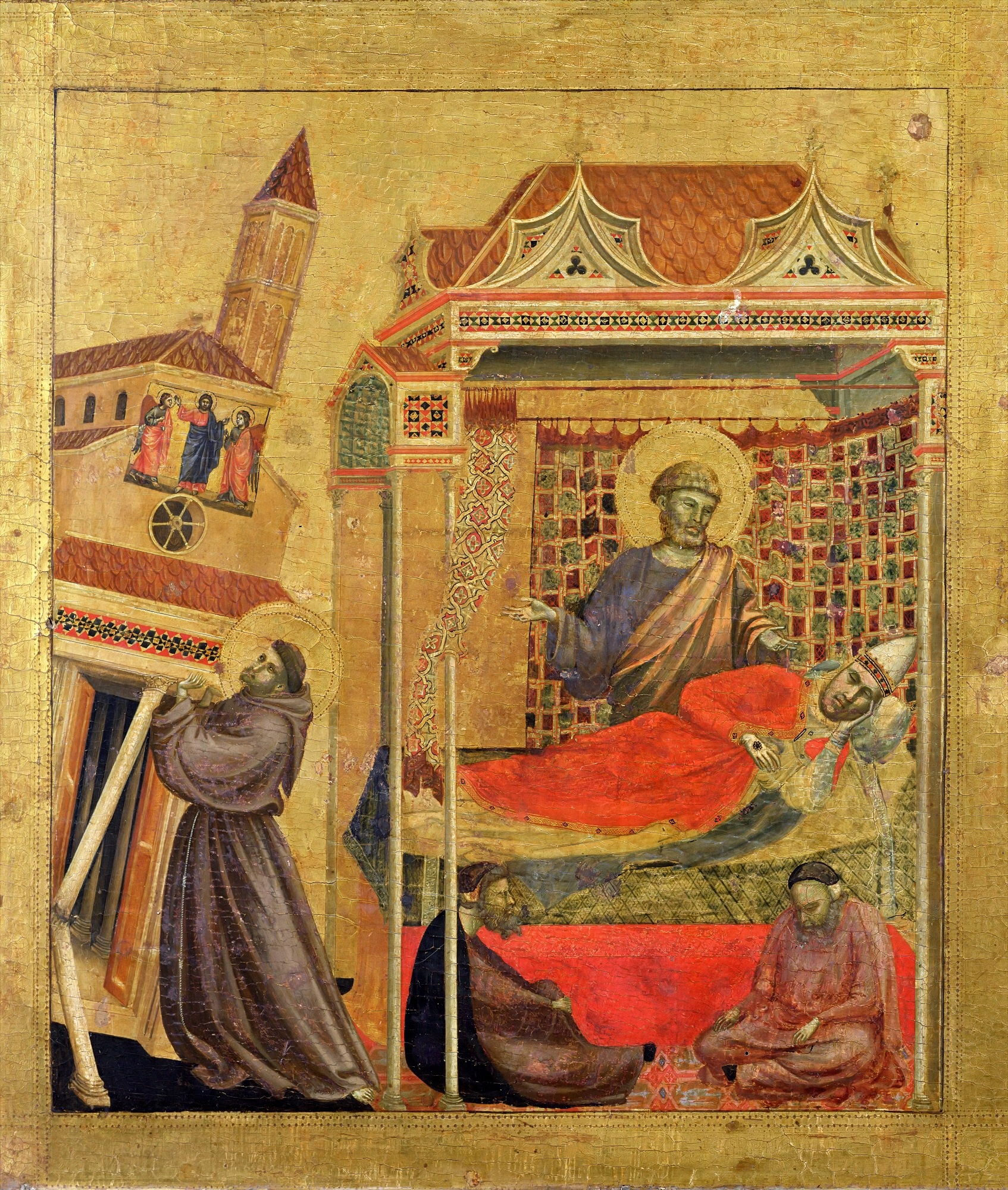
The Dream of Pope Innocent III

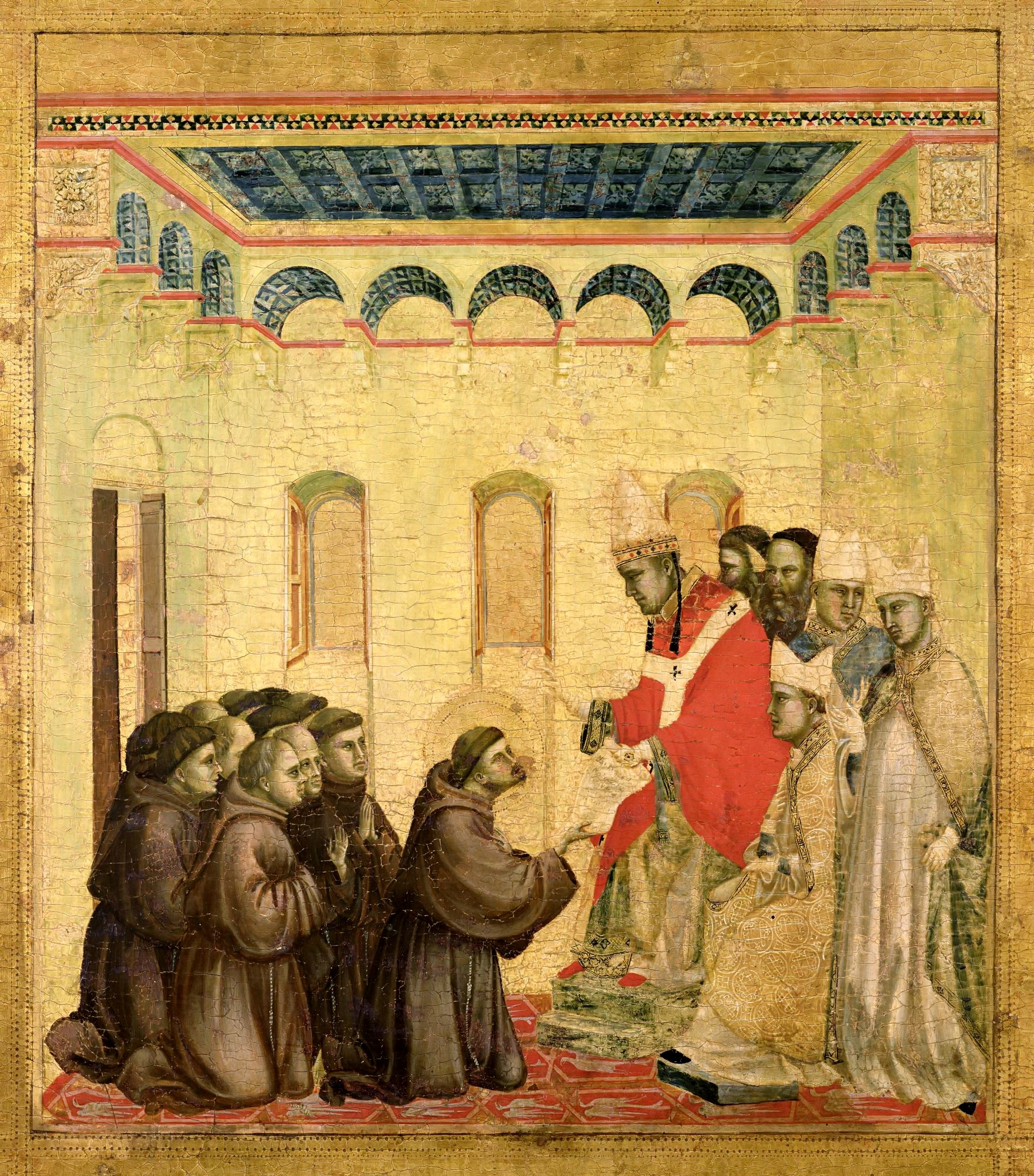
The Approval of the Franciscan Rule

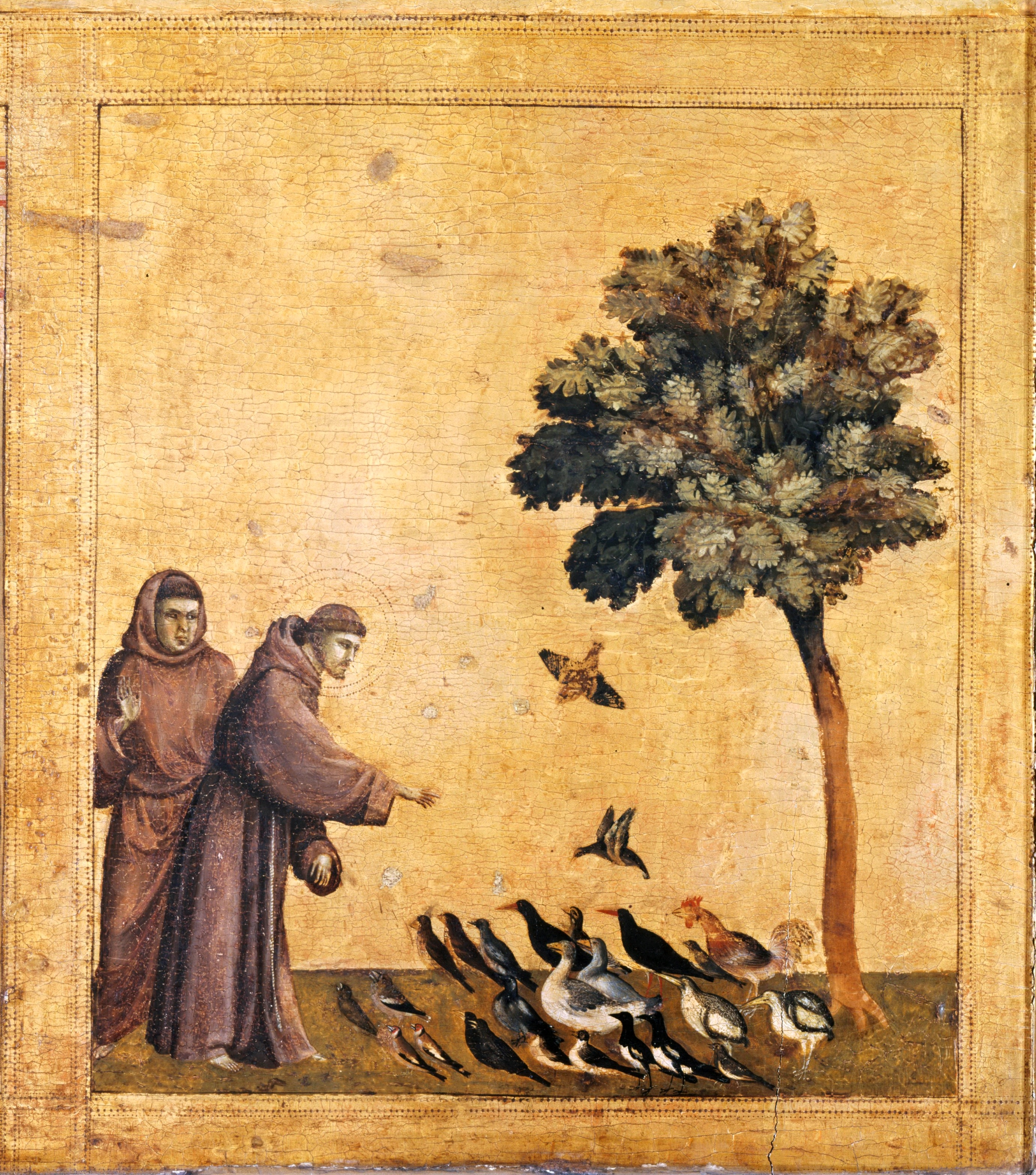
The Sermon to the Birds

== Sources ==
- Fossi, Gloria (2004). Uffizi. Florence: Giunti. p. 110.
- Edi, Baccheschi (1977). L'opera completa di Giotto. Milan: Rizzoli.
