= Santa Trinita Maestà =

13th-century panel painting by Cimabue

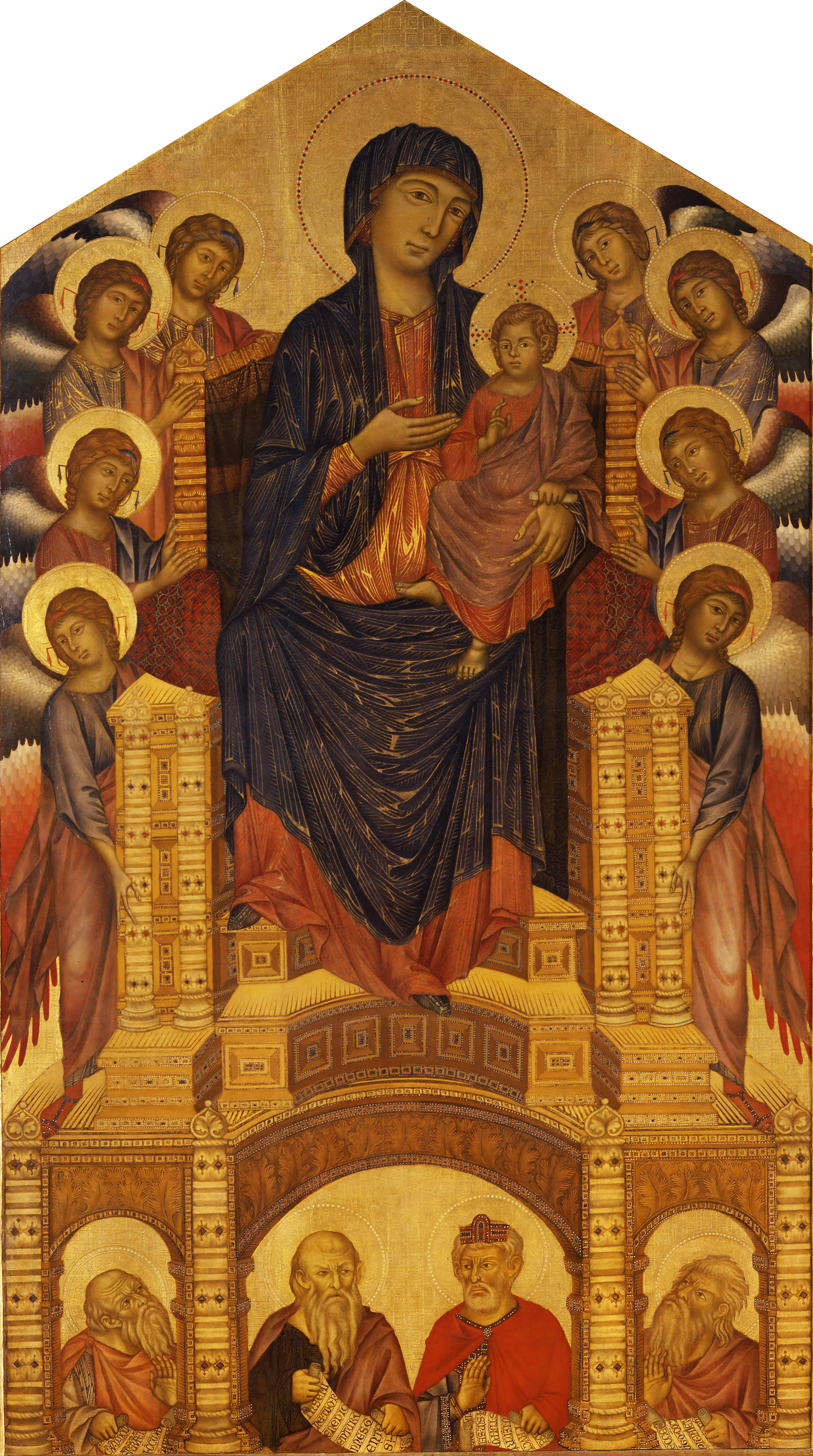
- Artist: Cimabue
- Year: c. 1290–1300
- Medium: Tempera on panel
- Dimensions: 384 cm × 223 cm (151 in × 88 in)
- Location: Uffizi Gallery, Florence

The Santa Trinita Maestà (Italian: Maestà di Santa Trinita) is a panel painting by the Italian medieval artist Cimabue, dating to c. 1290–1300. Originally painted for the church of Santa Trinita, Florence, where it remained until 1471, it is now in the Uffizi Gallery of Florence, Italy. It represents the Madonna enthroned with the Christ Child, who are surrounded by eight angels and, below, four half portraits of prophets.

== History ==
The commissioning client of the painting is unknown, but they could have been a member of the order of Vallombrosians, who governed the Santa Trinita at the time, or a member of another religious order that intended the painting for another destination.

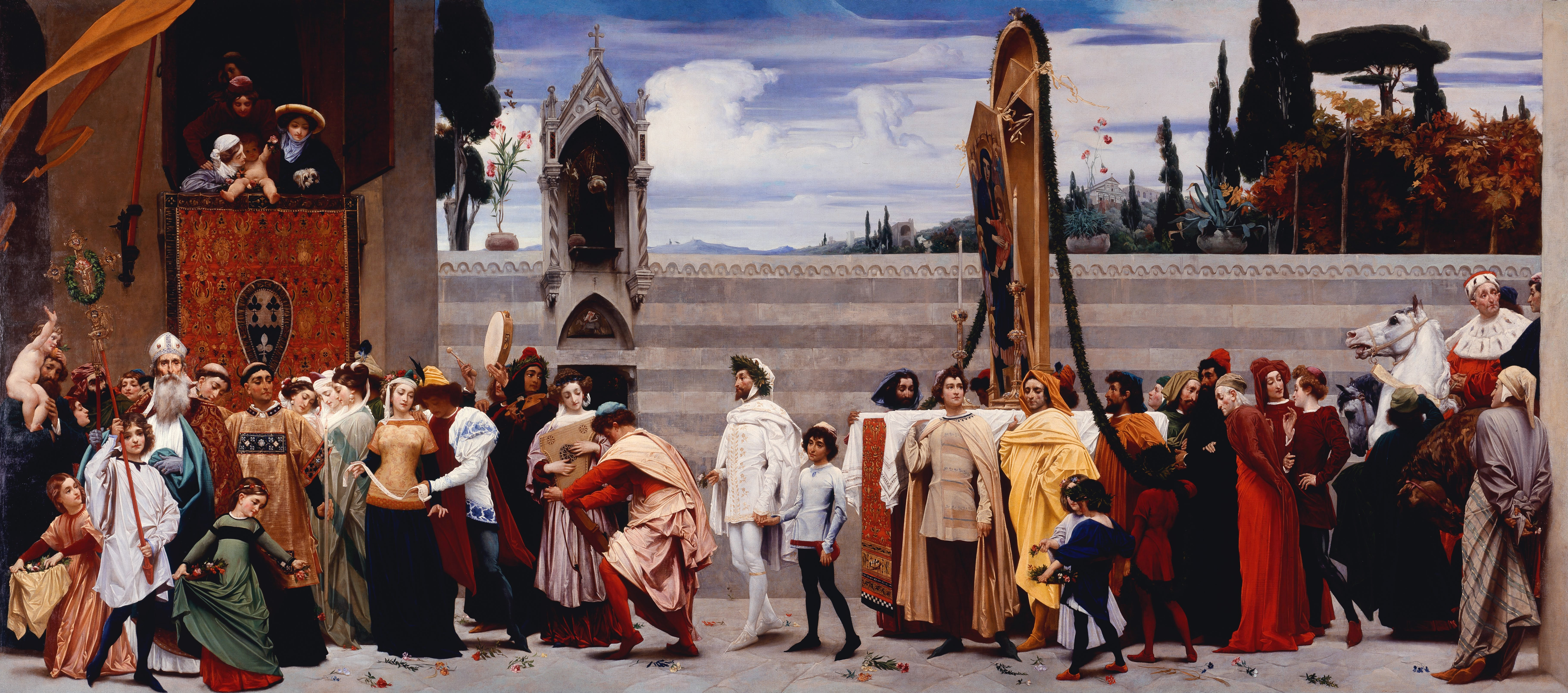
Cimabue's Madonna Carried in Procession, Frederic Leighton, oil on canvas, 1853–1855. Painted when the artist was 24 and living in Florence.

According to Vasari's testimony in his Lives, the work remained at the Santa Trinita until 1471, when it was replaced by the Trinitá of Alesso Baldovinetti and transferred to a side chapel of the church, since it was less respected than the newer Renaissance paintings. Over the years, it was eventually relegated to the infirmary of the monastery. With the reconsideration of "primitive" Italian art, the painting passed to the Florentine Galleria dell'Accademia in 1810 and then on to the Uffizi in 1919.

At an unknown date, the painting was cut into a rectangular shape by removing the uppermost part of the painting's apex and the addition of two parts on which angels were painted. The panel was returned to its original pointed form during its first restoration in 1890 by Oreste Cambi. Cambi removed the two additions and creating an appropriately styled point for the painting, which is still present. A second restoration was completed by Marcucci in 1947–1948 and a third by Alfio Del Serra in 1993.

Vasari, and the Libro di Antonio Billi attributed this painting to Cimabue, and the attribution has been confirmed by most modern scholars, with the exception of Guglielmo della Valle in the 18th century and Langton Douglas in the 19th. Critics are more divided, however, over the work's dating. It's uncertain whether the painting was executed before or after the frescoes at the Basilica of Saint Francis of Assisi. Contemporary critics have tended to date the work to after the frescoes, between 1290–1300.

== Description ==
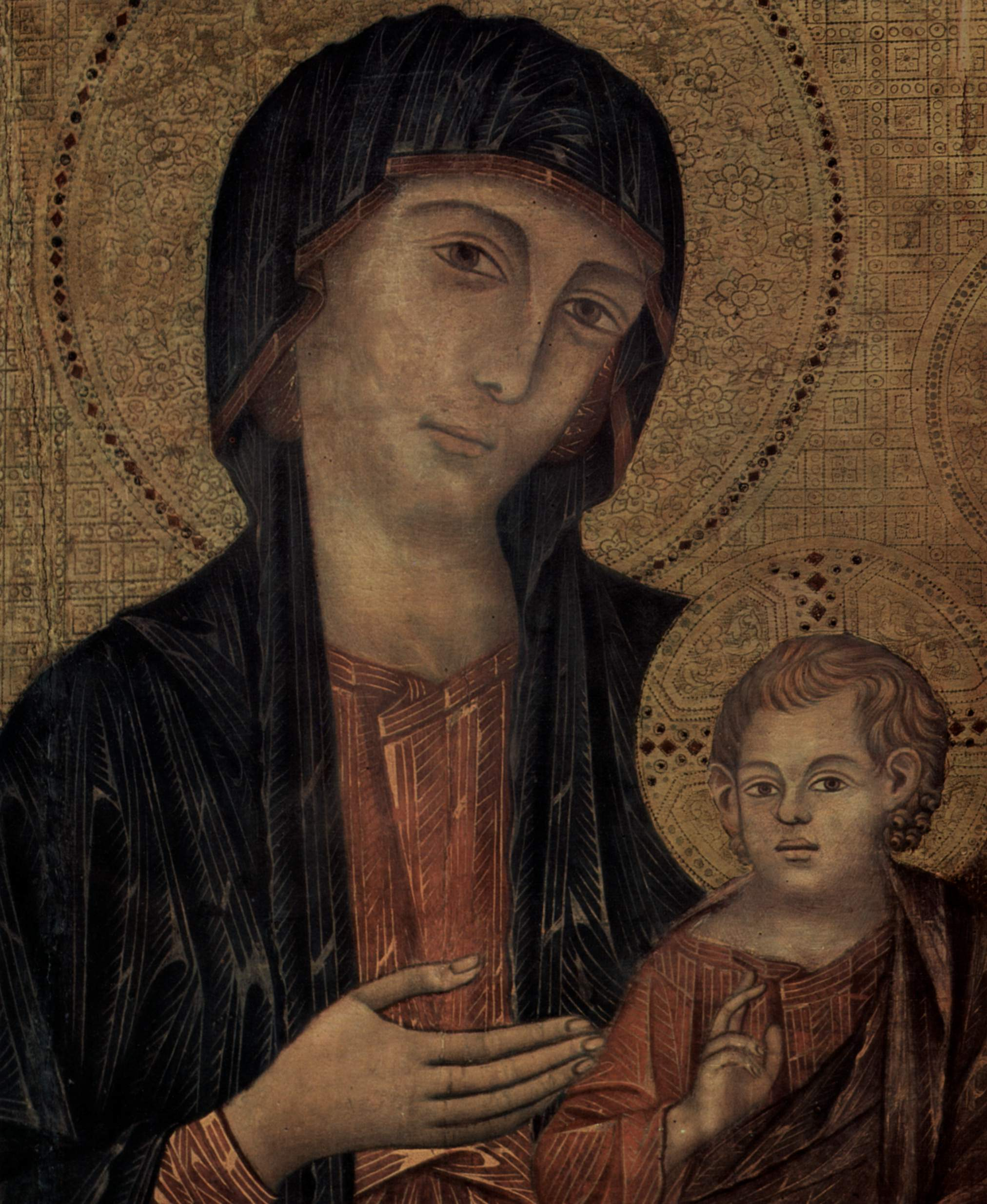
Detail of the Santa Trinita Maestà

The painting displays Byzantine iconography much like the Hodegetria archetype (in Greek, the name means "pointing the way"), because the Virgin is indicating toward the Baby Jesus. In this style, the Madonna symbolizes the Christian church and Jesus life, truth, and the proper way. The Madonna is depicted in three-quarters profile, while Jesus looks straight ahead.

The throne is depicted from an innovative frontal view, with a large gap at the center and seen in perspective, which gives it a sense of three dimensions unusual for the time. (The preceding Maestás of Cimabue depicted more angular thrones.) The throne assumes a new sense of might, as an architectural mass embellished with carvings and marquetry. This central perspective, used by the mature Cimabue, was taken up again by Giotto, Duccio, and other artists of the 14th century.

In a striking composition, the throne creates a stage with the wide opening in its base through which four prophets are depicted in half bust view. They are recognizable by their cartouchesm which contain verses from the Old Testament that refer to Marie and the Incarnation of Jesus. The verses certify their prophecies and evoke the descent of Jesus from their lineage. The first, with the text "Creavit Dominus Novum super terram foemina circundavit viro" is Jeremiah, followed by Abraham toward the center ("In semine tuo benedicentur omnes gentes") and David ("De fructu ventris tuo ponam super sedem tuam"), and finally Isaiah at right ("Ecce virgo concipet et pariet"). The gold behind the prophets, instead of flattening the painting, seems to accentuate the feeling of emptiness, which makes the prophets seem to stare out of windows or caves rather than that they are pressed against a wall.

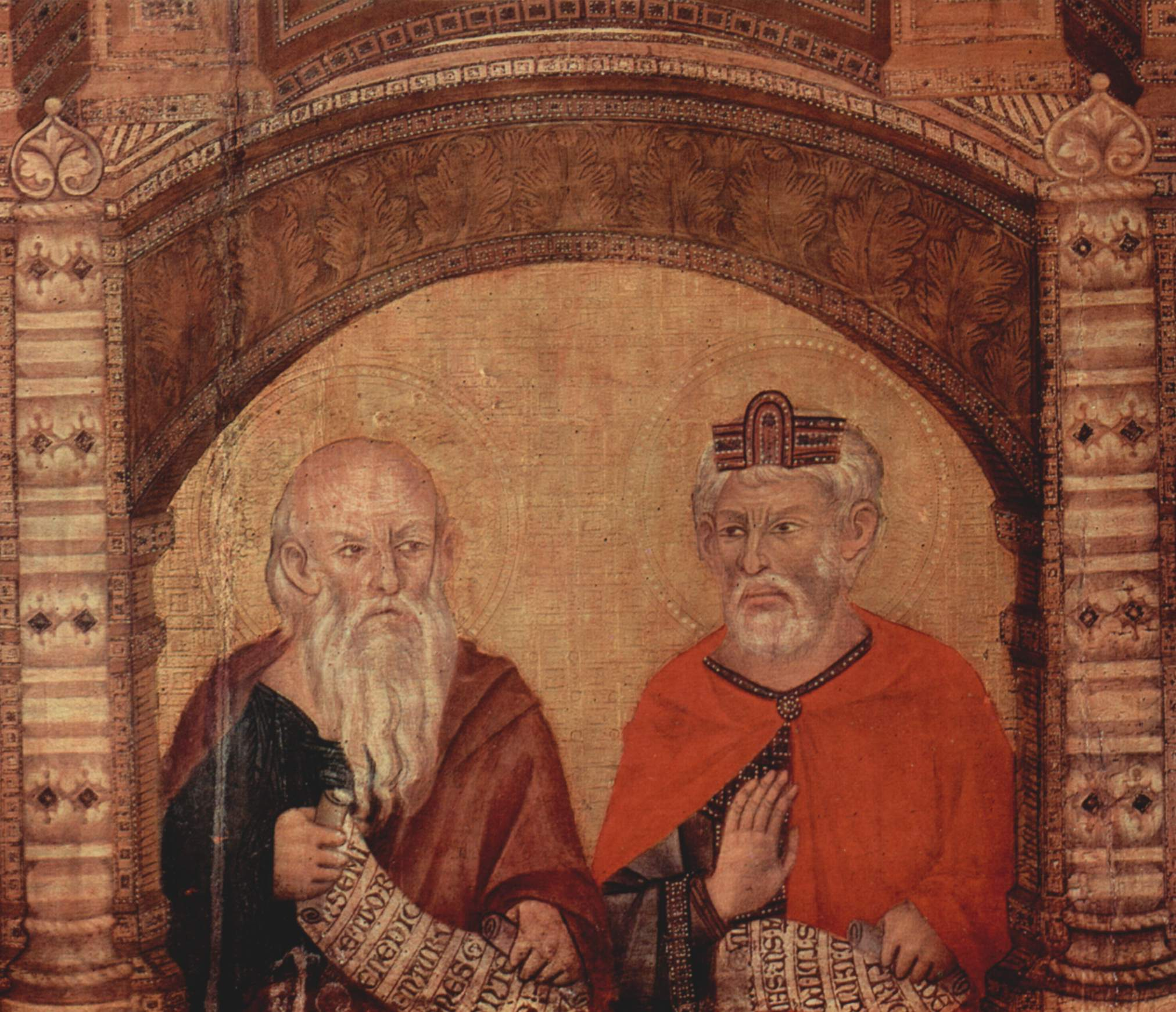
Detail of Abraham and David below the throne

Composed and solemn, Abraham and David in the center below the throne recall that Jesus descended from their lineage. The Christian meaning of the work, well-fitted to a church dedicated to the Holy Trinity, is thus focused on the threefold nature of the Virgin who is surrounded by the Holy Spirit. Below, at the sides of the throne, Jeremiah and Isaiah gaze up towards the child as if to confirm the prophecies written in their documents on the miraculous virgin birth of Jesus. With their gaze, they create a triangle whose vertex is the throne of Marie.

The arrangement of the four prophets has a precise doctrinal explanation: the patriarchs toward the center represent that human rational capacity, that inquires in the mystery of the Incarnation. Meanwhile, the prophets on the sides have dissolved their doubts through contemplation and are in a state of mystical rapture.

The heads of the angels are alternately inclined inwards or outwards, avoiding a completely profile representation, which was then reserved only for secondary or negative figures. (Giotto also broke that principle.) The angels closely resemble those in the Maestà of Cimabue in the frescoes of the Basilica inferiore di San Francesco d'Assisi. Their bodies are solid, modulated by a delicate chiarascuro that is delicately sfumato (a novel technique of Cimabue's) and the fluidity of their clothes. The red and blue colors of their clothes indicate their substance, according to Renaissance thought: a fusion of fire and air. The angels above turn their heads and sink into the third dimension.

== Style ==
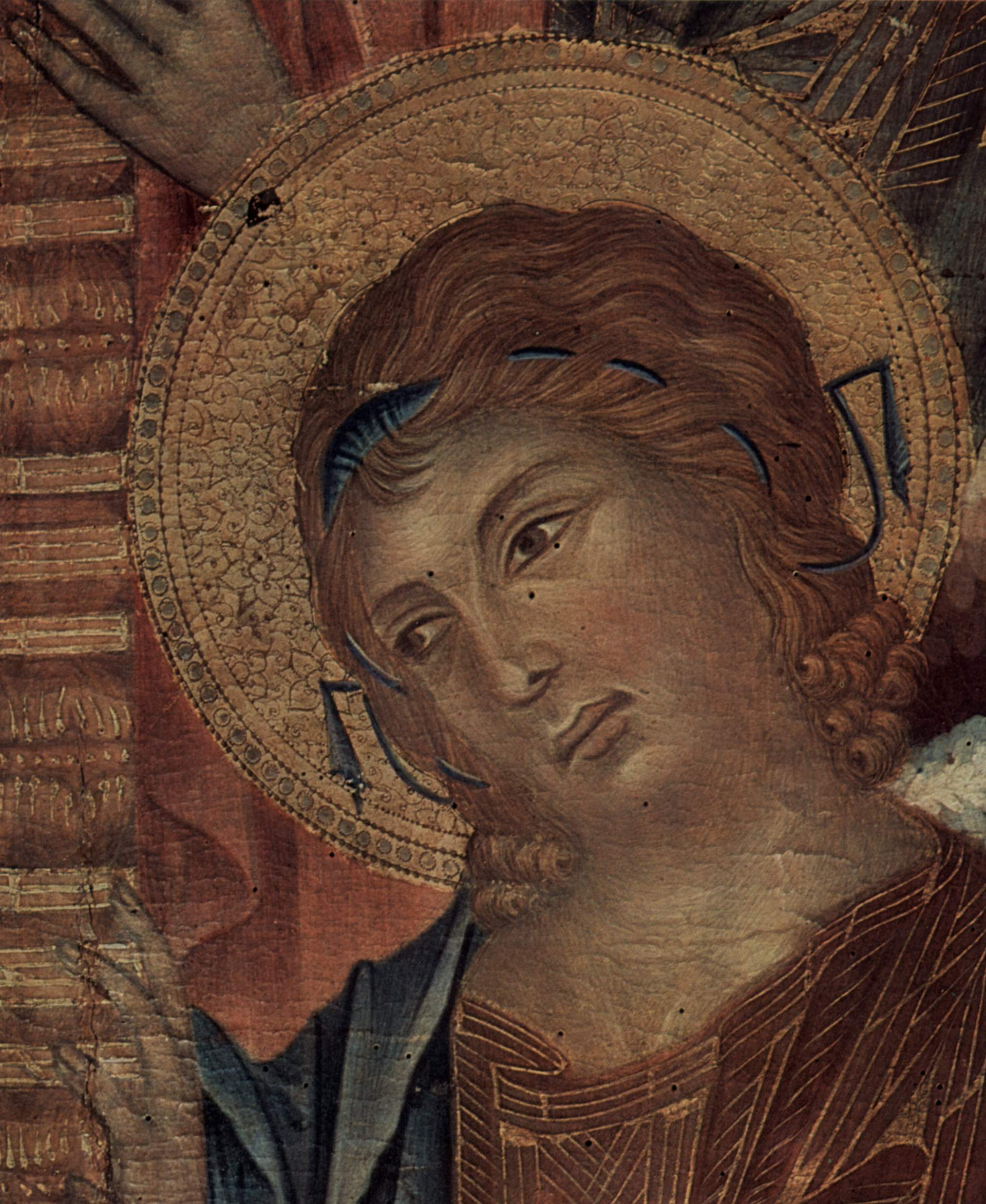
Detail of one of the angels

The painting demonstrates the mature style of Cimabue, in which the artist overcomes the more rigid Byzantine styles with forms that are more loose and humanistic. According to Giorgio Vasari, this style made Cimabue the first to replace that style. The frontal view of the throne, the serene face of the Virgin, the details of the blunt face and sfumatoed chiaroscuro place the work far from the Byzantine canon from which Cimabue gradually freed himself.

Compared to his preceding Maestà paintings, this one presents a more profound use of perspective. In the throne, there are three vertical panels with increasing depth, compared to the two panels of Cimabue's previous works. The pedestal and steps of the throne also have a concave design and are hollowed out in the front. The throne is shown from the front and reveals both its inner sides and that it is not a simple cross shape. The layout of the angels is also different. They are not simply placed over, but around the throne, which gives the composition further depth.

The figures are more expanded than Cimabue's earlier work, giving greater realism. The folds in clothing are no longer rigid and tight, as in the Maestà of the Louvre from c. 1280. Instead they fall amply, as over the legs of Marie, or appear less arched, as in the blue mantle that covers her head. Byzantine iconography reappears in that blue mantle, but only for decorative purposes—a serene addition to the ample folds. The golden highlights from Damascening suggest the fluid touch of light on the Madonna's mantle and the clothing of Jesus. And the facial chiarascuro creates more effective contrast.

There is also better anatomical features to the faces, with their smoothed edges and detailed brushstrokes. For example, the Madonna has a cut at the level of her nostril that slips into the fin of her nose or accents her smile, a detail missing from early Cimabue.

Despite these improvements, there is a certain resistance to the stylistic innovations and techniques of Duccio and Giotto. This Maestà does not have the figurative refinement of the two works of the 1280s by Duccio, the Rucellai Madonna and the Crevole Madonna. Even the innovations of students of Giotto from 1290 on, barely appear here. The contrasts achieved here by Cimabue, for example, do not follow the principles of a single light source. Nor do the folds seem to find better positions over the bodies. The gazes remain vague. The color palette is also limited in its complexity, especially when compared with the recent developments of the nascent Sienese School and the palette of Giotto himself. In that, Cimabue seems to recreate features of his earlier work, which made him famous but now make him seem outdated compared to his contemporaries.

=== Dating ===
Although there are not documents to attest to a specific date, the work is placed by recent critics in the mature phase of Cimabue, between c. 1290 and 1300, on the basis of stylistic details.

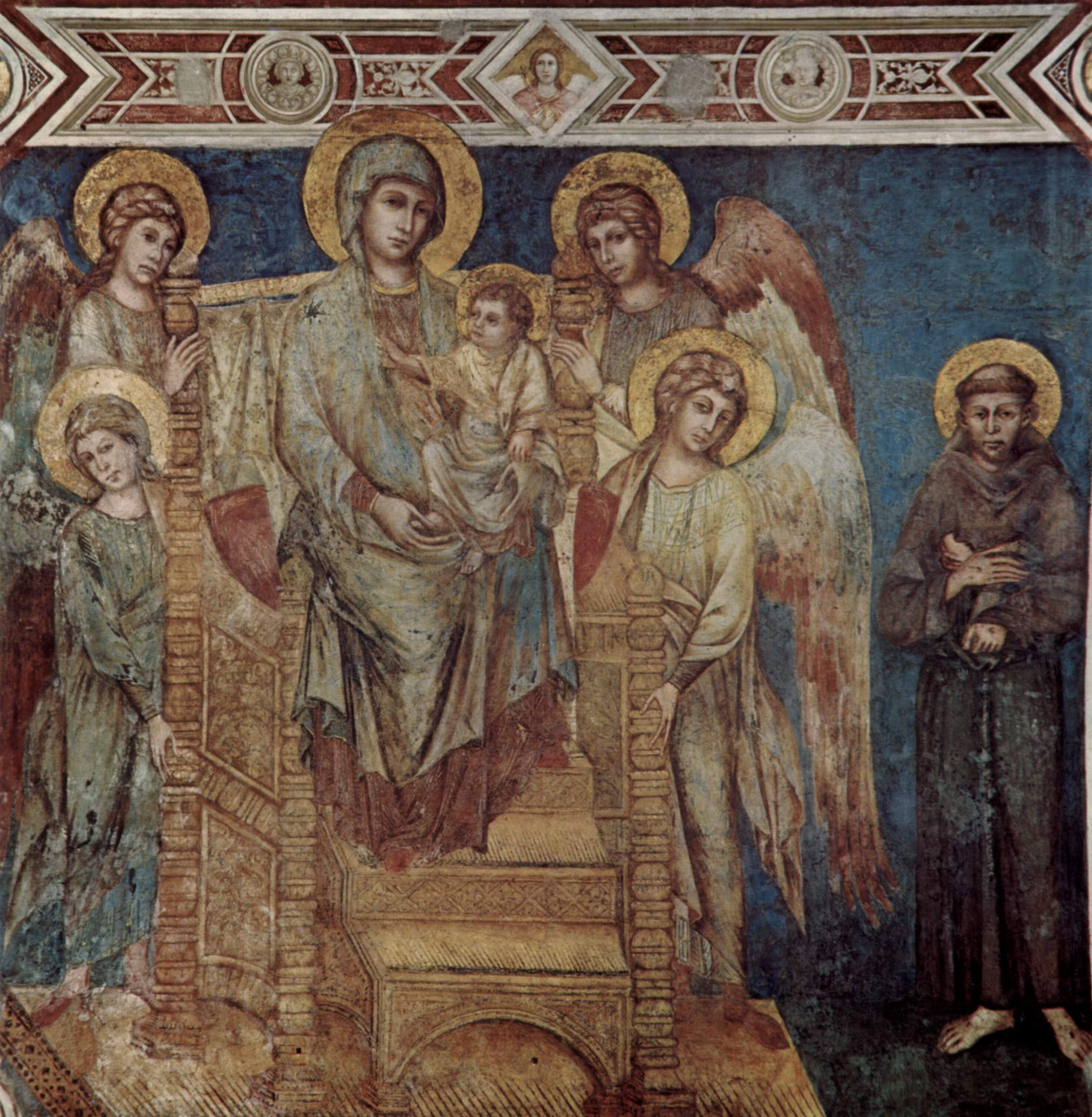
Detail of Cimabue's Maestà di Assisi fresco, c. 1288

The Marie sitting upon the throne has a distinctly large size, greater than the more tapered Maestà of the Louvre of c. 1280. This transition is seen in the frescoes of Basilica superiore di San Francesco d'Assisi of c. 1288–1292, where the figures have a size not seen in Cimabue's previous works. The folds of blue mantles no longer wraps but drapes loosely on bodies, on the knees of Marie, for example. The folds above her head fall vertically and are not drawn into concentric circles as in the first Madonna paintings by Cimabue, like the Louvre Maestà, Virgin and Child with Two Angels, or the Maestà of Santa Maria dei Servi. A more recent, similar painting is the Maestà di Assisi of c. 1288. In the Santa Trinita Maestà, Marie's mantle opens over her chest to reveal the red maphorion beneath, in a manner similar to the 1288 Maestà and differing from the others.

The bridge of the nose has the faded left outline and the nostrils don't look like a simple thickening, but a kind of incision that enter the fin of the nose, details lacking in the earlier Maestàs. The mouth has a serene air, almost a smile, that contrasts with the sad and serious air of the Louvre Maestà and the Virgin and Child with Two Angels, but that is found in the Maestà di Assisi and Maestà of Santa Maria dei Servi.

Even the color of the angels' wings is indicative. It changes from dark colors of flight feathers below, to the clear, lively colors of down feathers that grow darker the higher they are. This palette use seems like the end of the evolution that started with the c. 1280 Louvre Maestà.

But there three details that help locate this Maestà after the Maestà di Assisi of c. 1288. The throne is represented from the front and not diagonally, as in all the other Cimabue Maestàs. The passage of the diagonal representation to one that is frontal is seen in the Assisi frescoes. There, only in the apse representing Christ and the Virgin Enthroned and the last of the Assisi frescoes, is there a frontal view. Even the students of Duccio and Giotto depicted thrones in this way for all of the 1290s and others, indicated as the representation of a frontal-view throne was a late achievement of Cimabue, found it only in this Santa Trinita Maestà. The second detail is the nose bridge that is straight instead of hooked, as in the earlier Maestàs, including those in Assisi. Finally, the aureola: it is adorned with dark punches in the external margins, a style of the 1290s that is also in the Assisi halos.

A dating after the Maestà di Assisi in 1288 and the Assisi frescoes that ended in 1292, when Cimabue returned to Tuscany, seems reasonable for this Maestà.

== Bibliography ==
- Battisti, Eugenio (1963). Cimabue (in Italian). Milan: Istituto Editoriale Italiano.
- Sindona, Enio (1975). Cimabue e il momento figurative pregiottesco (in Italian). Milan: Rizzoli Editore.
- Fossi, Gloria (2004). Uffizi : arte, storia, collezioni (in Italian). Firenze: Giunti. p. 110. ISBN 88-09-03675-1.
- Baldriga, Irene (2016). Dentro l'arte (in Italian). Milan.
