= San Francesco, Pisa =

Church in Pisa, Tuscany, Italy

Coordinates: 43°43′6″N 10°24′23″E

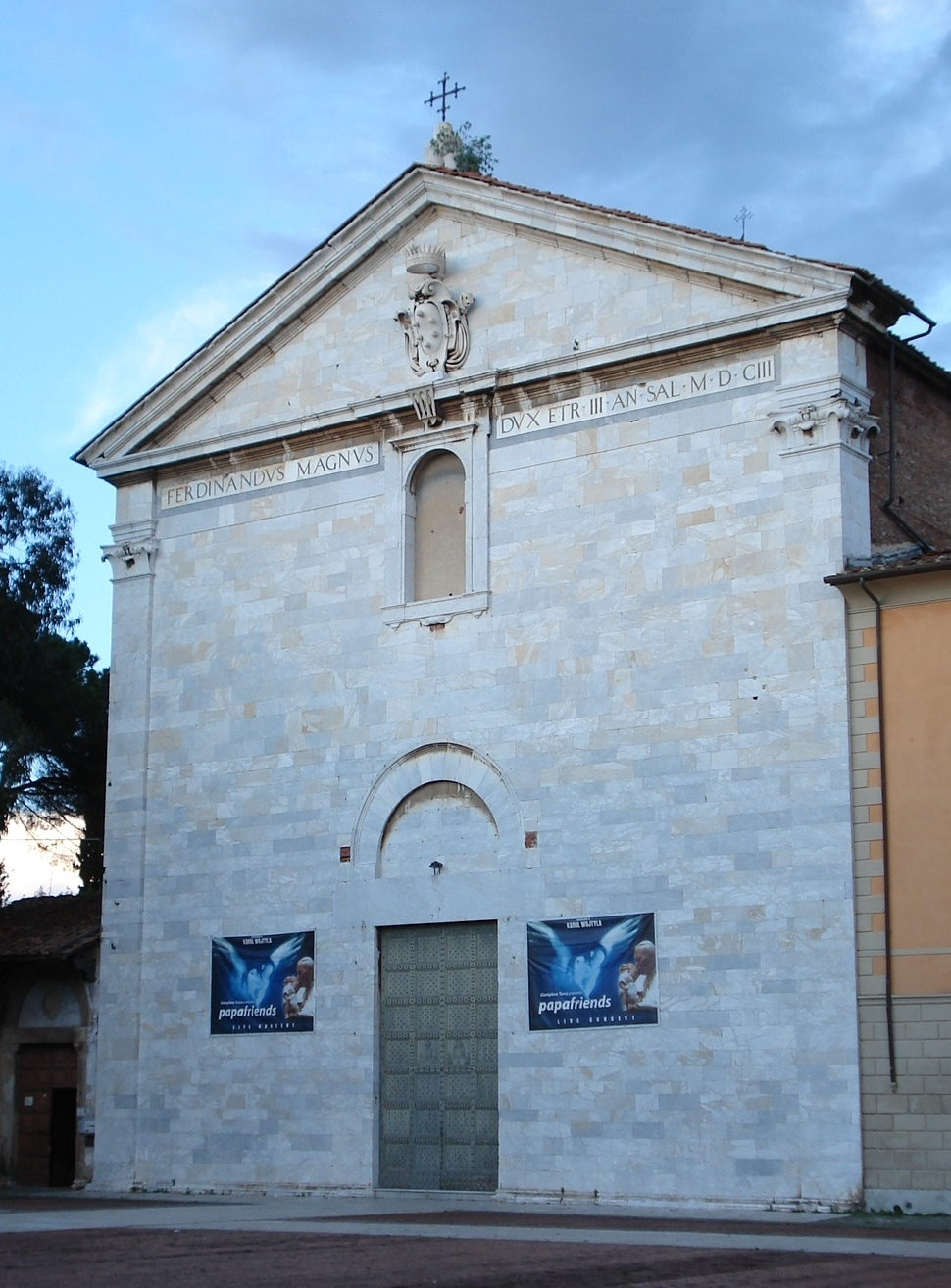
Façade

San Francesco de' Ferri is a church in Pisa, Tuscany, Italy.

Mentioned for the first time in a document from 1233, the church was rebuilt starting from 1261 by will of archbishop Federico Visconti. The church was under the patronage of the Pisane noble families, who owned a series of private chapels for their burials; the Franciscan were limited to the administration of the cult. The works, directed by Giovanni di Simone, ended in 1270 and included also the slender bell tower.

The marble façade is from 1603. The interior was revamped in the same age, with paintings by Jacopo da Empoli, Domenico Passignano and Santi di Tito. In the transept are frescoes by Taddeo Gaddi (1342-1345), Galileo Chini (20th century) and an altar frontal by Tommaso Pisano (late 14th century).

The sacristy has frescoes by Taddeo di Bartolo (1397) with Histories of Mary, while the Capitolium Hall has frescoes by Niccolò di Pietro Gerini with Histories of the life of Christ (1392). The rectangular cloister is from the 14th century.

After a period as military barracks, the church was declared national monument in 1893. The church was once home to Giotto's Stigmata of St. Francis and Cimabue's Maestà, both robbed by the French in the 1810s and now housed at the Louvre Museum.

== Sources ==
- Barsali, U.; U. Castelli; R. Gagetti; O. Parra (1999). Storia e Capolavori di Pisa. Florence: Bonechi.
- Donati, Roberto. Pisa. Arte e storia. Narni: Plurigraf.
