= Maestà (Cimabue) =

Painting by Cimabue

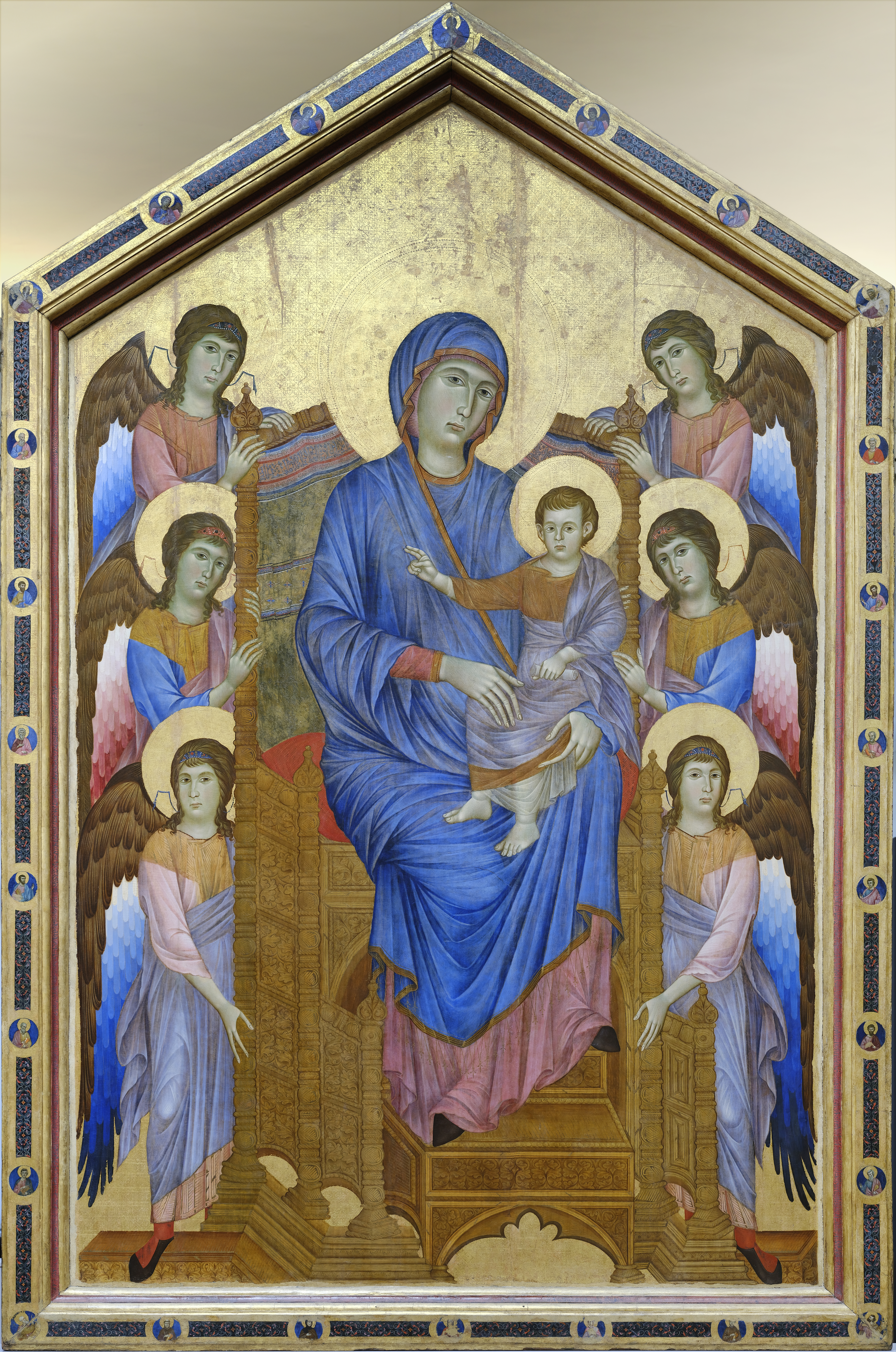
- Artist: Cimabue
- Year: c. 1280
- Medium: Tempera on panel
- Dimensions: 424 cm × 276 cm (167 in × 109 in)
- Location: Louvre, Paris

The Maestà is a painting by the Italian artist Cimabue, executed around 1280 and now in the Musée du Louvre in Paris.

== History ==
It was acquired by the Louvre in 1813 as part of Napoleonic looting of artworks in Italy, together with Giotto's Saint Francis Receiving the Stigmata, also from the church of San Francesco in Pisa.

== Description ==
The work is considered to be from around 1280, thus preceding the Santa Trinita Maestà. It is also stylistically earlier to that work, being painted without pseudo-perspective, and having the angels around the Virgin simply placed one above the other, rather than being spatially arranged. The throne is similar to the Maestà painted by Cimabue in the Basilica of San Francesco di Assisi (1288–1292).

This work established a new canon for the Madonna with Child, which was subsequently used by other painters, such as Duccio di Buoninsegna in his Rucellai Maestà.

== Sources ==
- Fossi, Gloria (2004). Uffizi. Florence: Giunti. p. 110.
