= Raimo Epifanio Tesauro =

Italian painter

Raimo Epifanio Tesauro (c. 1480–1511) was an Italian painter of the Renaissance period. He was born and died in Naples, was the son (or nephew) and pupil of Bernardo Tesauro. He painted several works in fresco in the public buildings of Naples.
