= Bernardo Tesauro =

Italian painter

Bernardo Tesauro (1440–1500) was an Italian painter of the Renaissance period.

== Biography ==
Tesauro was born in Naples. He was a relative of Filippo Tesauro. He was a pupil of Silvestre dei Buoni. He painted an Assumption of the Virgin for the church of San Giovanni Maggiore in Naples.

Tesauro also painted frescoes in the chapel of San Aspreno in the Cathedral of Naples. He died in Naples. He painted the Seven Sacraments in the ceiling of the church of San Giovanni di Pappacodi. The Marriage scene represent Ferdinand II of Naples marrying Ippolita Maria Sforza.
