= Santa Maria dei Servi, Bologna =

Basilica in Bologna, Italy

Coordinates: 44.4917°N 11.3526°E

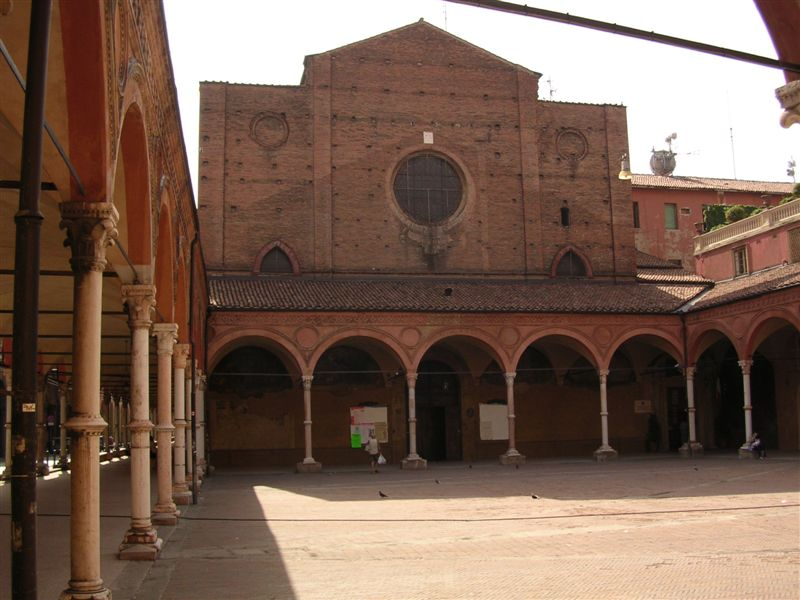
The portico and the façade of Santa Maria dei Servi in Bologna.

Santa Maria dei Servi is a Roman Catholic basilica in Bologna, Italy.

It was founded in 1346, as the church of the Servite Community of the Blessed Virgin Mary and was designed by Andrea da Faenza, a head friar and architect who also assisted Antonio di Vincenzo on the monumental Basilica of San Petronio. In the 20th century, Pope Pius XII granted the church the status of "basilica".

== Architecture ==
=== Interior ===
The basilica is 100 metres long by 20 metres wide. It has the form of a Latin cross but the transepts do not project beyond the aisles. The shallow apse is five segments of an octagon, as is common in Italian Gothic churches.

It was designed in the Gothic style with pointed arches throughout. At the death of Padre Andrea in 1396, the work was not complete. However, the completion in the 15th century saw little change to the design of the basilica itself, which is entirely Gothic in appearance.

The central nave and side aisles are divided from each other by stout round columns with floriate capitals, the shafts being red in colour and the capitals and bases of contrasting pale stone, adding a decorative effect to the very simple architecture. The plastered walls above the arcade are pierced by ocular windows set high under the gothic vault. The vault is of a simple quadrupartite form with the brick ribs in contrast to the infilling.

=== Exterior ===
Externally, the church is very plain, undecorated brick. The facade, which was constructed in several phases, has never been decorated.

A remarkable feature of the church is its courtyard or atrium. This is a feature that was common in Early Christian churches, including the earlier St. Peter's Basilica in Rome, but has almost always disappeared. This is an unusual case of an atrium being built in the 16th century. It appears to have been modelled on the arcade built by Brunelleschi at the Hospital of the Innocents (Ospedale degli Innocenti) in Florence, and later extended to other parts of the large piazza, including the front of the Church of the Assumption.

In the case of Santa Maria dei Servi, the piazza in front of the basilica was quite small—which permitted building a wide arcade around it that encloses the entire square without interruption. The arcade is closed on one side by the conventual buildings, but on two sides it is open to the street, and extends along the entire left side of the building. Where the arcade meets the facade, it forms a "narthex" or wide portico of five arches, stretching across the front of the church. The arcade has a decorative cornice and circular moulding on the spandrels echoes the ocular window in the facade.

== Artworks ==
The many works of art still housed in the church include a Holy Virgin Enthroned traditionally attributed to Cimabue but thought to be a product of his workshop, remains of 14th-century frescoes by Vitale da Bologna and Lippo di Dalmasio, paintings by Innocenzo da Imola and Francesco Albani, and a marble altarpiece of the Annunciation of Mary (1558) by Giovanni Angelo Montorsoli, a pupil of Michelangelo.

The church also possesses a widely praised pipe organ, made in 1967 by the Tamburini company of Crema, which can be operated with a mechanical action.
