= Rucellai Madonna =

1285 painting by Duccio di Buoninsegna

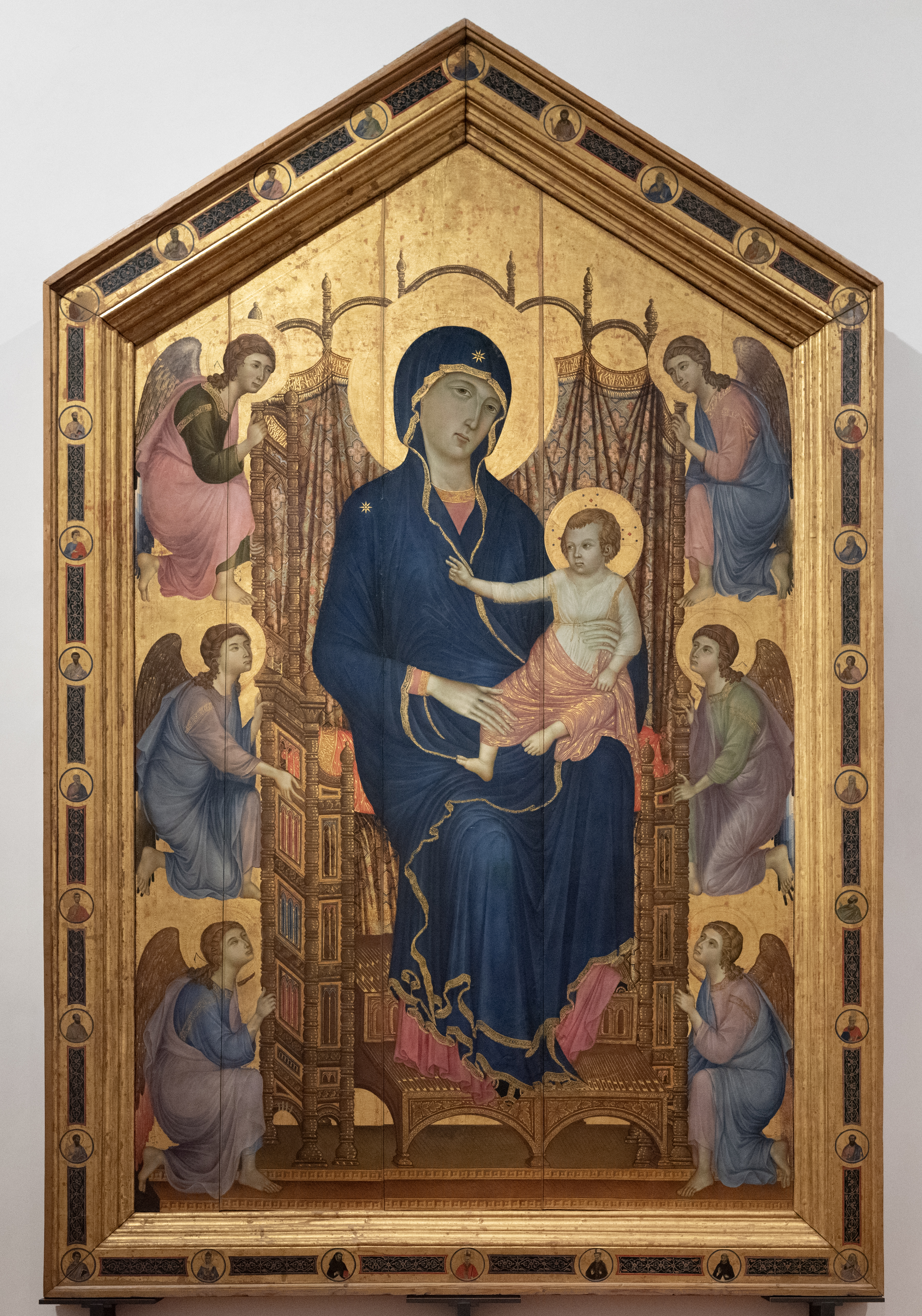
- Artist: Duccio di Buoninsegna
- Year: 1285 (commissioned)
- Type: Tempera and gold on panel
- Dimensions: 450 cm × 290 cm (180 in × 110 in)
- Location: Uffizi Gallery; Florence

The Rucellai Madonna is a panel painting by the Sienese painter Duccio di Buoninsegna showing the Virgin and Child enthroned with Angels. The contract for the work is dated 1285. The painting was probably completed in 1286, and was commissioned by the Laudesi confraternity of Florence to decorate the chapel they maintained in the Dominican church of Santa Maria Novella. In 1591, the painting was moved to the adjacent, much larger Rucellai family chapel, hence the modern title of convenience. In the 19th century it was transferred to the Galleria degli Uffizi. The Rucellai Madonna is the largest surviving 13th-century panel painting.

== History ==
The Rucellai Madonna is the earlier of the two works by Duccio for which there is written documentation (the other is the Maestà of 1308–11). The altarpiece was commissioned by the Compagnia dei Laudesi, a lay confraternity devoted to the Virgin, to decorate the chapel they occupied in the transept of the newly built Dominican church of Santa Maria Novella in Florence. The contract for the painting, dated 15 April 1285, is the oldest Italian document of its kind to survive. The contract states that Duccio was commissioned to paint a panel depicting the Virgin and Child and "other figures,” for which he was to be paid 150 lire. It enjoins the artist to work on no other commissions while completing the altarpiece, and specifies that the entire work must be painted by Duccio alone without workshop assistance. The contract also requires the artist to pay for and use ultramarine blue for the Virgin's robe and real gold leaf for the background. The framed panel itself—the largest of the Dugento—was supplied by the Laudesi. The patron had the right of refusal.

In the 16th century, the art historian Giorgio Vasari mistakenly attributed the Rucellai Madonna to Duccio's contemporary, Cimabue, in his Lives of the Most Eminent Painters, Sculptors, and Architects. This mistake went unchallenged for centuries; in the 19th century Frederic Leighton depicted the Rucellai Madonna paraded through the streets in his first major painting, which bore the title Cimabue's Celebrated Madonna Carried in Procession (1853–55). In 1889, however historian Franz Wickhoff compared stylistic choices between the Rucellai Madonna and Duccio's Maestà, and soon other critics agreed that Duccio had indeed painted the Rucellai Madonna.

== Description ==
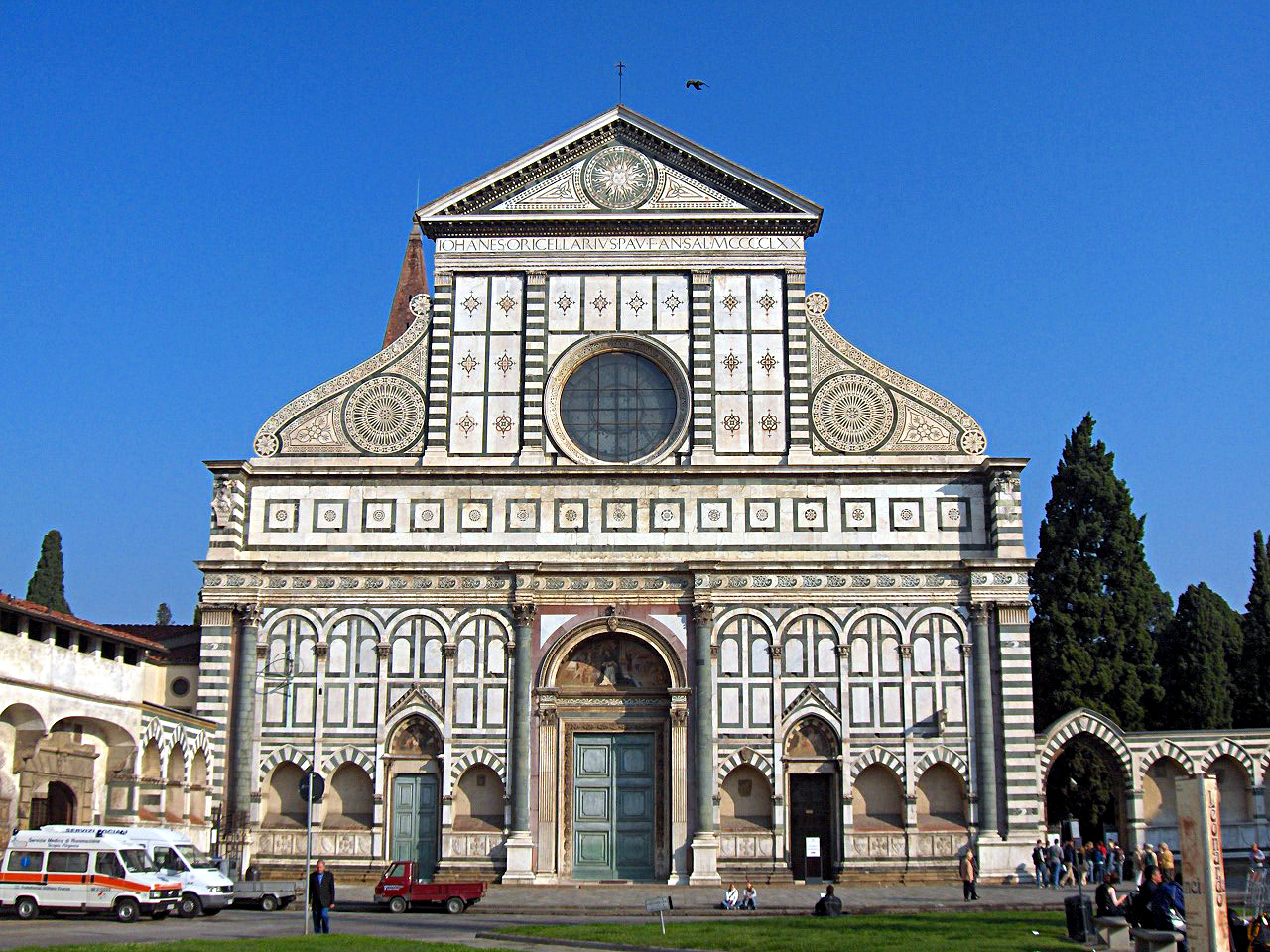
Santa Maria Novella in Florence, the original location of the Rucellai Madonna.

The work, measuring 4.5 by 2.9 meters, was painted in egg tempera on a five-pieced poplar panel. The panel and frame would have been constructed by a master carpenter and then handed over to Duccio for painting. The frame is of the same wood. Although the contract required Duccio to use costly, ultramarine blue, made from ground lapis lazuli, conservators restoring the panel in 1989 determined the pigment of the Virgin's robe to be the cheaper substitute, azurite. Over the centuries, the blue pigments darkened considerably and the green bole underpainting of the fleshtones became more visible. A more recent restoration has rectified those issues, thereby greatly enhancing the tonal unity and subtle naturalism of the work.

The iconography of the painting was determined by the needs of the patrons and the Dominican order. The members of the Laudesi met in the chapel to sing lauds, or Latin hymns praising the Virgin; an image of Mary provided a focus for those devotions. The roundels on the frame represent apostles, saints, and prominent members of the Dominican order, including Saints Dominic and Thomas Aquinas.

Given the bitter political enmity of Florence and Siena, the Florentine civic group's choice of a Sienese artist is noteworthy. Siena regarded the Virgin not only as its patron saint, but as Queen of the city. As a result of this association, Sienese artists like Guido da Siena and Duccio came to specialize in Marian imagery. Although compositional and iconographic sources of the Rucellai Madonna are Byzantine icons, Duccio's work was modeled on recent Sienese works, and not derived directly from a Greek model. The emphasis on grace and refinement seen in the Virgin's gown and stylized anatomy may reflect a familiarity with French Gothic art (which is also suggested by the aspects of the later Maestà).

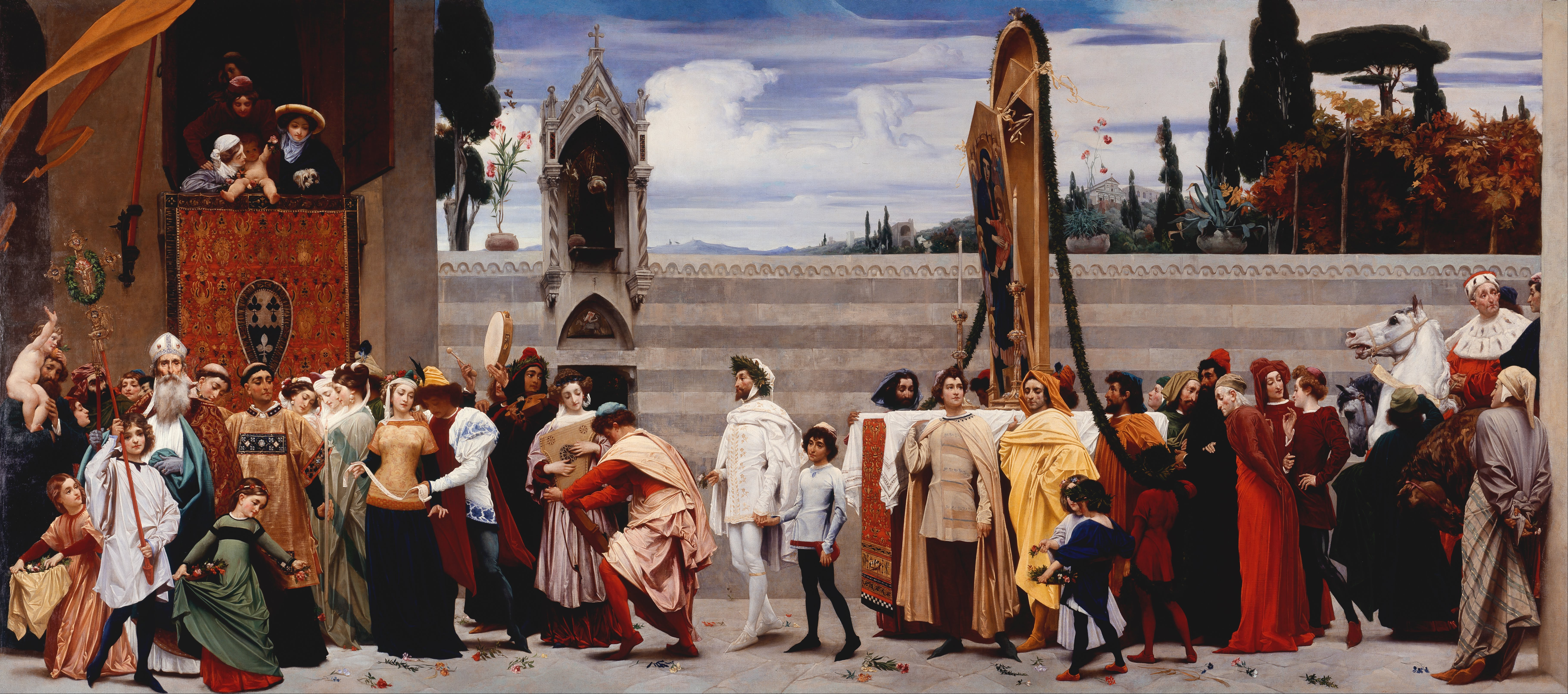
Cimabue's Celebrated Madonna Carried in Procession (1853–55) by Frederic Leighton

== Legacy ==
The Rucellai Madonna is currently displayed in the first gallery of the Galleria degli Uffizi, along with Cimabue's Santa Trinità Maestà (c. 1285) and Giotto's Ognissanti Madonna (1306). This choice follows Vasari's example by locating the originary moment (“i primi lumi”) of Italian Renaissance painting in the works of those artists. This tendentious and teleological conception of late medieval works as early instantiations of the naturalistic, volumetric, and spatial concerns of the Quattrocento is, however, misleading at best, as it divorces those images from their proper historical contexts and selectively emphasizes stylistic qualities that resemble later artistic currents of which 13th-century painters would obviously been unaware. Hence, Rucellai Madonna is often described as a naturalistic advance over primitive Italo-Byzantine stylization, a willful misreading of a gold-ground, highly stylized and ethereal image that has much more in common with Paleologan icons than with Masaccio.

== Sources ==
- Carli, Enzo (1952). Duccio. Milan.
- Bellosi, Luciano (1994). "Duccio". Enciclopedia dell'Arte Medioevale. Rome.
