= Filippo Tesauro =

Italian painter

Filippo Tesauro (1260–1320) was an Italian painter of the Renaissance period, active mainly in Naples. He was the pupil of the painter Tommaso de Stefani the elder. In Naples, he painted the Life of St. Niccolo Eremita in Santa Restituta.

== Sources ==
- Farquhar, Maria (1855). Ralph Nicholson Wornum (ed.). Biographical catalogue of the principal Italian painters. London: Woodfall & Kinder. p. 178.
- Hobbes JR. 435
