= Cimabue =

Italian artist (1240–1302)

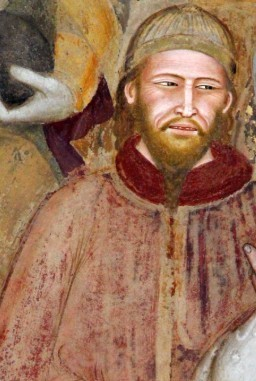
- Fresco portrait by Andrea di Bonaiuto, c. 1366
- Born: Giovanni Cenni di Pepo c. 1240; Florence, Republic of Florence
- Died: 1302; Pisa, Republic of Pisa
- Notable work: Santa Trinita Maestà, Maestà at Santa Maria dei Servi, Crucifix at Santa Croce

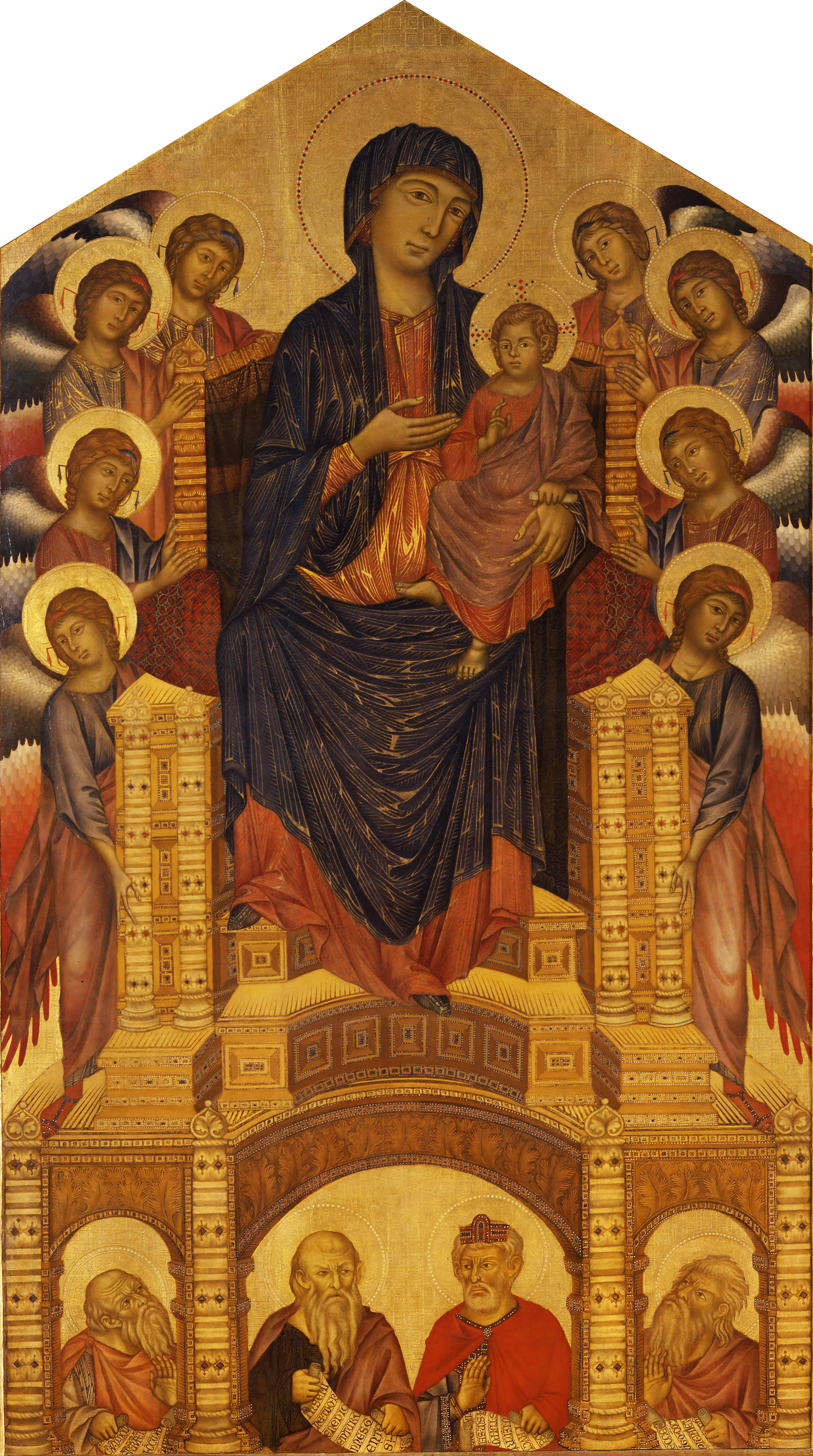
Santa Trinita Maestà, 1280–1285, Uffizi Gallery, Florence

Giovanni Cimabue (/ˌtʃiːməˈbuːeɪ/ CHEE-mə-BOO-ay, Italian: [tʃimaˈbuːe]; c. 1240 – 1302), also known as Cenni di Pepo or Cenni di Pepi, was an Italian painter and designer of mosaics from Florence.

Although heavily influenced by Byzantine models, Cimabue is generally regarded as one of the first great Italian painters to break from the Italo-Byzantine style. Compared with the norms of medieval art, his works have more lifelike figural proportions and a more sophisticated use of shading to suggest volume. According to Italian painter and historian Giorgio Vasari, Cimabue was the teacher of Giotto, the first great artist of the Italian Proto-Renaissance. However, many scholars today tend to discount Vasari's claim by citing earlier sources that suggest otherwise.

== Life ==
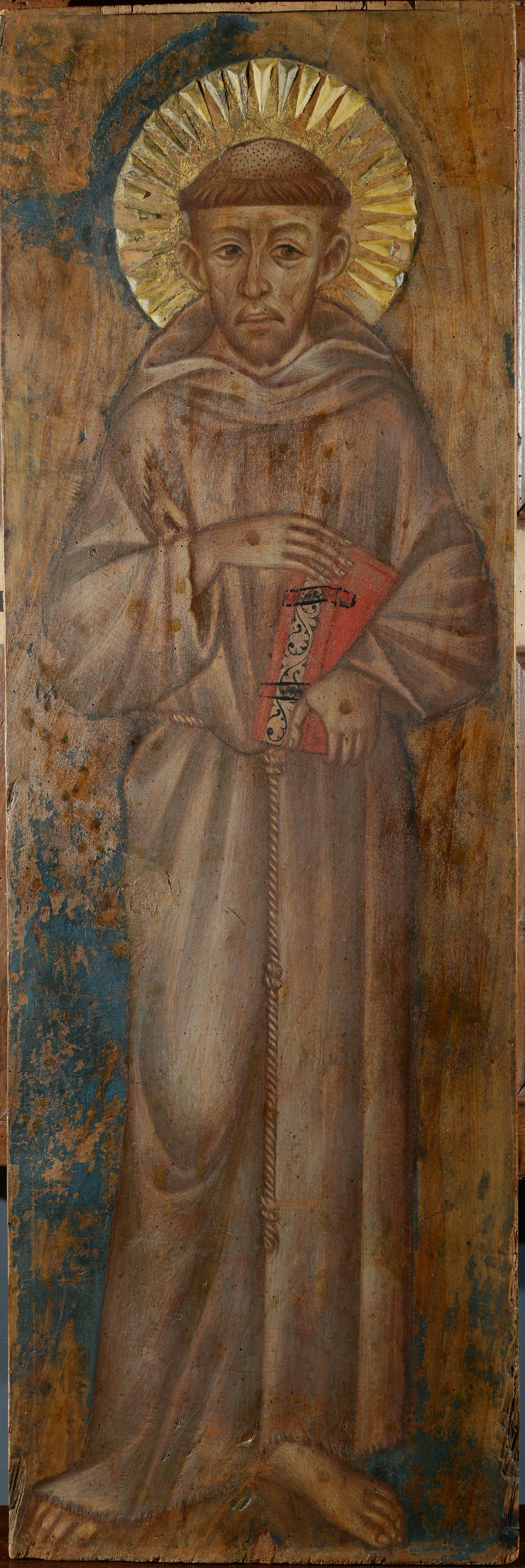
St. Francis of Assisi

Little is known about Cimabue's early life. One source that recounts his career is Vasari's Lives of the Most Excellent Painters, Sculptors, and Architects, but its accuracy is uncertain.

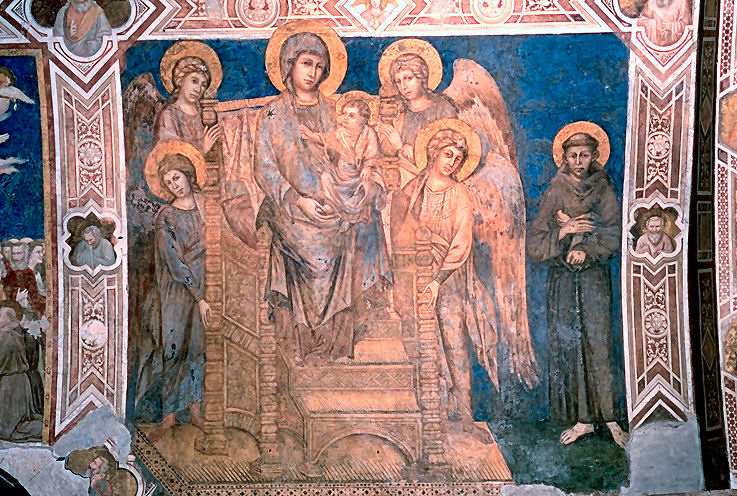
Fresco in the Lower Basilica of Assisi

He was born in Florence and died in Pisa. Hayden Maginnis speculates that he could have trained in Florence under masters who were culturally connected to Byzantine art. The art historian Pietro Toesca attributed the Crucifixion in the church of San Domenico in Arezzo to Cimabue, dating around 1270, making it the earliest known attributed work that departs from the Byzantine style. Cimabue's Christ is bent, and the clothes have the golden striations that were introduced by Coppo di Marcovaldo.

Around 1272, Cimabue is documented as being present in Rome, and a little later he made another Crucifix for the Florentine church of Santa Croce. Now restored, after having been damaged by the 1966 Arno River flood, the work was larger and more advanced than the one in Arezzo, with traces of naturalism perhaps inspired by the works of Nicola Pisano.

According to Vasari, Cimabue, while travelling from Florence to Vespignano, came upon the 10-year-old Giotto (c. 1277) drawing his sheep with a rough rock upon a smooth stone. He asked if Giotto would like to come and stay with him, which the child accepted with his father's permission. Vasari elaborates that during Giotto's apprenticeship, he allegedly painted a fly on the nose of a portrait Cimabue was working on; the teacher attempted to sweep the fly away several times before he understood his pupil's prank. Many scholars now discount Vasari's claim that he took Giotto as his pupil, citing earlier sources that suggest otherwise.

Around 1280, Cimabue painted the Maestà, originally displayed in the church of San Francesco at Pisa, but now at the Louvre. This work established a style that was followed subsequently by numerous artists, including Duccio di Buoninsegna in his Rucellai Madonna (in the past, wrongly attributed to Cimabue) as well as Giotto. Other works from the period, which were said to have heavily influenced Giotto, include a Flagellation (Frick Collection), mosaics for the Baptistery of Florence (now largely restored), the Maestà at the Santa Maria dei Servi in Bologna and the Madonna in the Pinacoteca of Castelfiorentino. A workshop painting, perhaps assignable to a slightly later period, is the Maestà with Saints Francis and Dominic now in the Uffizi.

During the pontificate of Pope Nicholas IV, the first Franciscan pope, Cimabue worked in Assisi. At Assisi, in the transept of the Lower Basilica of San Francesco, he created a fresco named Madonna with Child Enthroned, Four Angels and St Francis. The left portion of this fresco is lost, but it may have shown St Anthony of Padua (the authorship of the painting has been recently disputed for technical and stylistic reasons). Cimabue was subsequently commissioned to decorate the apse and the transept of the Upper Basilica of Assisi, in the same period of time that Roman artists were decorating the nave. The cycle he created there comprises scenes from the Gospels, the lives of the Virgin Mary, St Peter and St Paul. The paintings are now in poor condition because of oxidation of the brighter colours that were used by the artist.

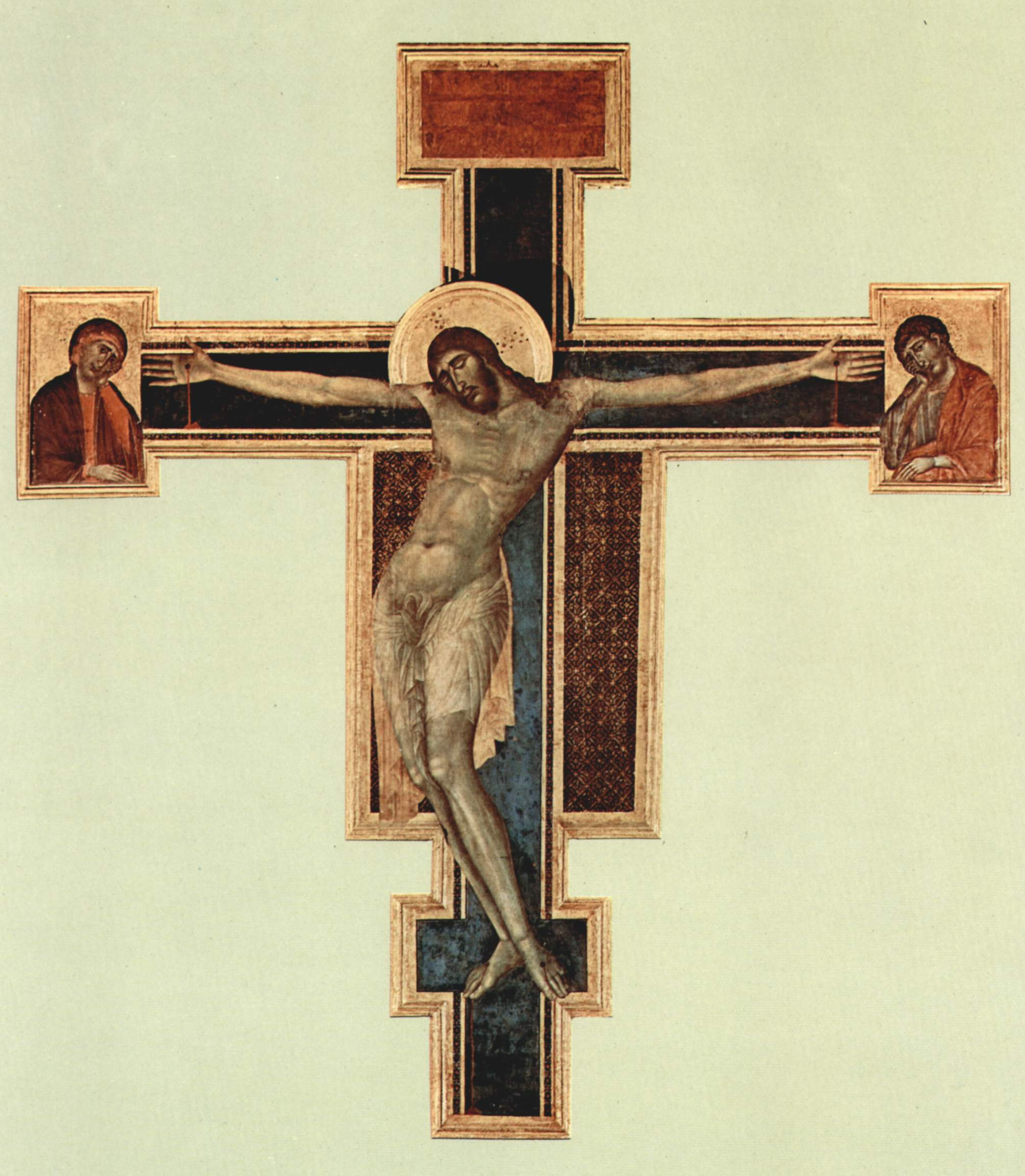
Crucifix, 1287–1288, Panel, 448 cm × 390 cm (176.4 in × 153.5 in), Basilica di Santa Croce, Florence

The Maestà of Santa Trinita, dated to c. 1290–1300, which was originally painted for the church of Santa Trinita in Florence, is now in the Uffizi Gallery. The softer expression of the characters suggests that it was influenced by Giotto, who was by then already active as a painter.

Cimabue spent the last period of his life, 1301 to 1302, in Pisa. There, he was commissioned to finish a mosaic of Christ Enthroned, originally begun by Maestro Francesco, in the apse of the city's cathedral. Cimabue was to create the part of the mosaic depicting St John the Evangelist, which remains the sole surviving work documented as being by the artist. Cimabue died around 1302.

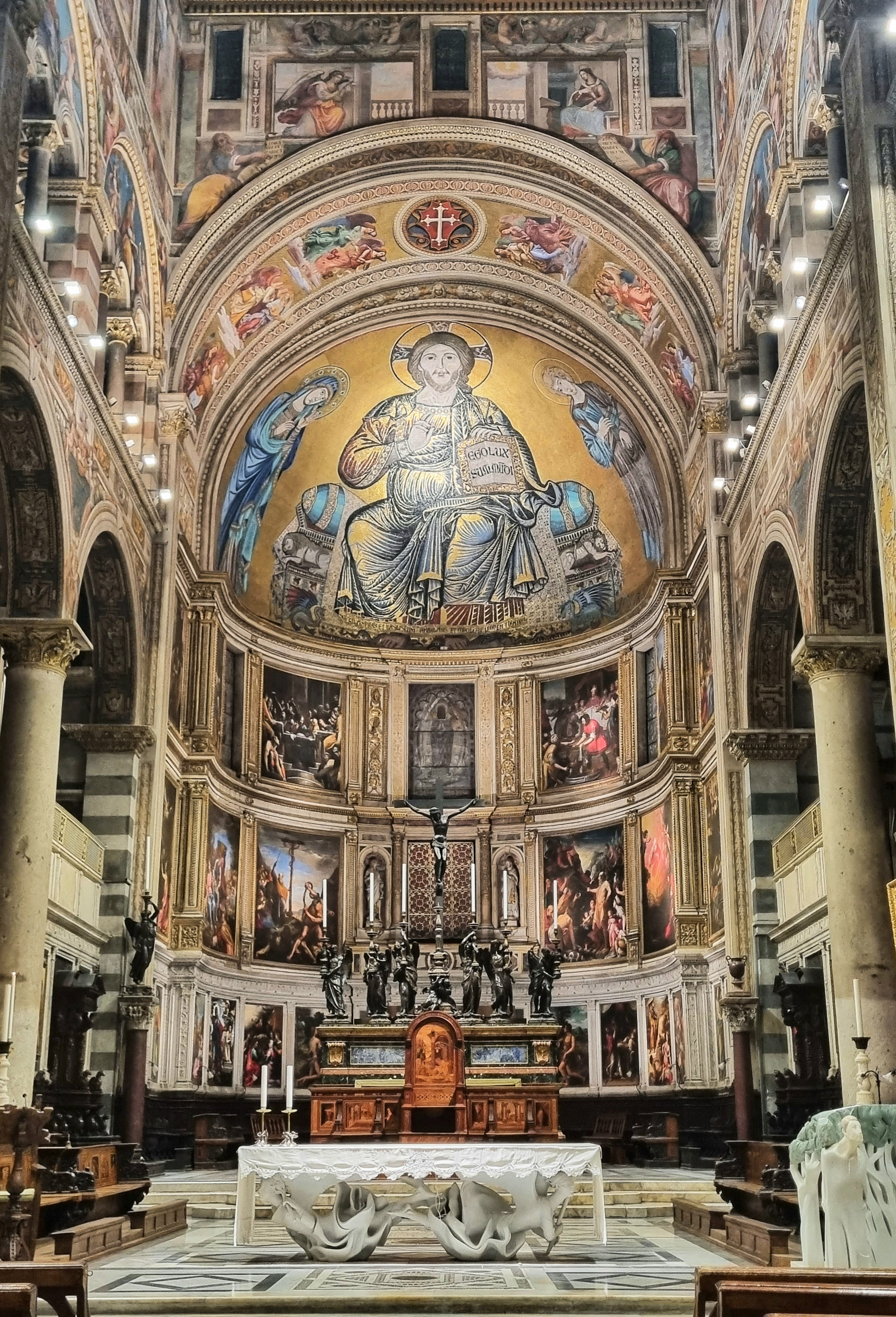
The mosaic in its architectural context

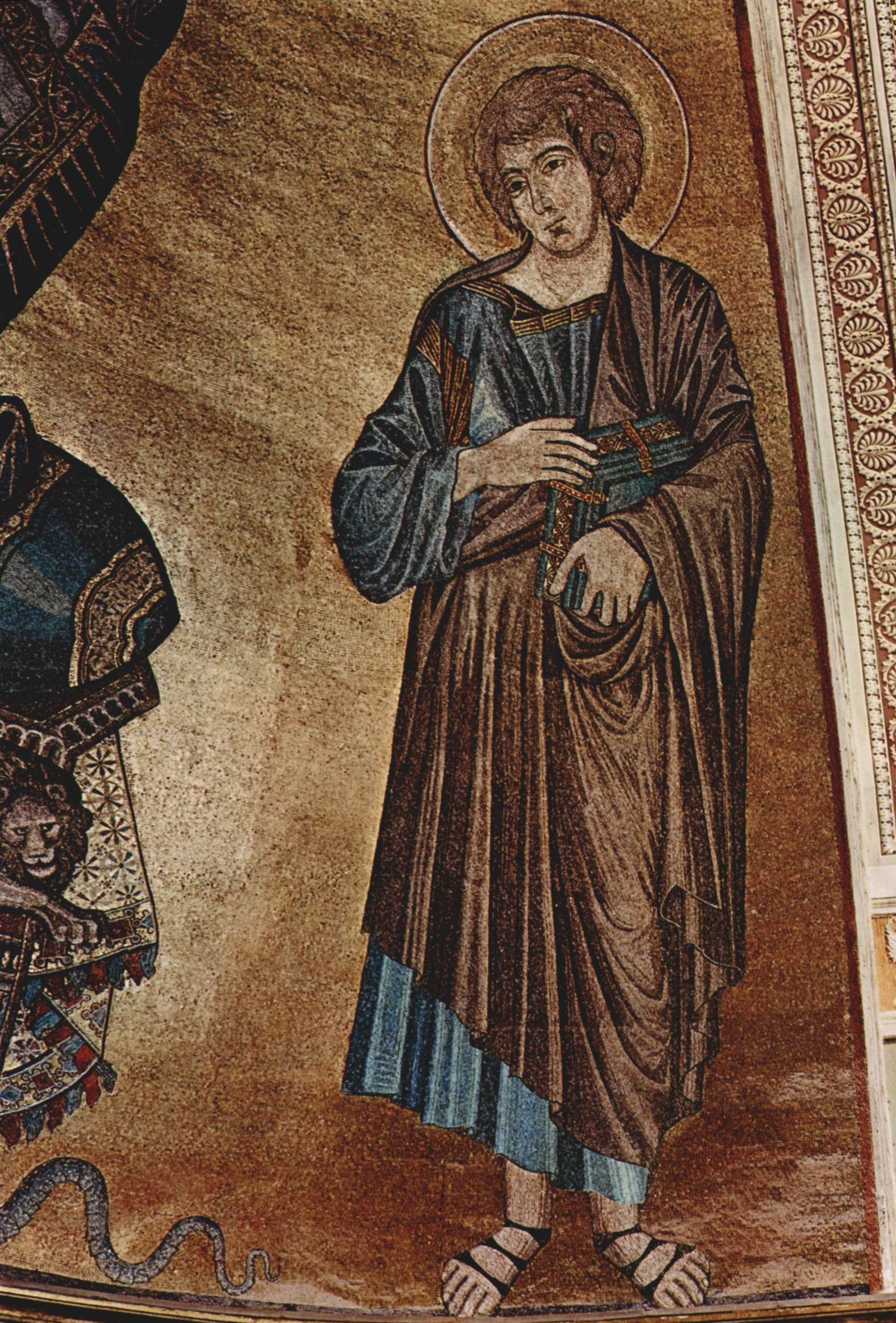
The figure of Saint John, the only documented work by Cimabue

== Character ==
According to Vasari, quoting a contemporary of Cimabue, "Cimabue of Florence was a painter who lived during the author's own time, a nobler man than anyone knew but he was as a result so haughty and proud that if someone pointed out to him any mistake or defect in his work, or if he had noted any himself ... he would immediately destroy the work, no matter how precious it might be."

The nickname Cimabue translates as "ox-head" but also possibly as "one who crushes the views of others", from the Italian verb cimare, meaning "to top", "to shear", and "to blunt". The conclusion for the second meaning is drawn from similar commentaries on Dante, who was also known "for being contemptuous of criticism".

== Legacy ==
History has long regarded Cimabue as the last of an era that was overshadowed by the Italian Renaissance. As early as 1543, Vasari wrote of Cimabue, "Cimabue was, in one sense, the principal cause of the renewal of painting," with the qualification that, "Giotto truly eclipsed Cimabue's fame just as a great light eclipses a much smaller one."

== In Dante's Divine Comedy ==
In Canto XI of his Purgatorio, Dante laments the quick loss of public interest in Cimabue in the face of Giotto's revolution in art. Cimabue himself does not appear in Purgatorio, but is mentioned by Oderisi, who is also repenting for his pride. The artist serves to represent the fleeting nature of fame in contrast with the Enduring God.

O vanity of human powers,
how briefly lasts the crowning green of glory,
unless an age of darkness follows!
In painting Cimabue thought he held the field
but now it's Giotto has the cry,
so that the other's fame is dimmed.

== Market ==
On 27 October 2019, The Mocking of Christ, was sold for €24m (£20m; $26.6m), a price the auctioneers described as a new world record for a medieval painting. The picture had been located in the kitchen of a home in northern France, and its owner had been unaware of its value.

== List of works ==
While none of Cimabue's works are signed or securely dated, art historians have attributed several to him, with varying degrees of certainty. Many works in major collections have been erroneously attributed to Cimabue.

List of works attributed to Cimabue
Image	Title	Medium	Location
	Crucifix	Tempera and gold on wood	San Domenico, Arezzo
	Crucifix	Tempera and gold on wood	Santa Croce, Florence
	Maestà	Tempera and gold on wood	Louvre
	Virgin and Child with Two Angels	Tempera and gold on wood	National Gallery, London
	The Mocking of Christ	Tempera and gold on wood	Louvre
	The Flagellation of Christ	Tempera and gold on wood	Frick Collection
	The Naming of John the Baptist	Mosaic	Florence Baptistery
	John the Baptist Entering the Wilderness	Mosaic	Florence Baptistery
	Original Sin	Mosaic	Florence Baptistery
	Reproach of God	Mosaic	Florence Baptistery
	Expulsion from the Garden of Eden	Mosaic	Florence Baptistery
	Joseph Sold by His Brothers into Slavery	Mosaic	Florence Baptistery
	Joseph's Parents Mourn His Loss	Mosaic	Florence Baptistery
	Joseph Goes into Egypt	Mosaic	Florence Baptistery
	Maestà	Tempera and gold on wood	Santa Maria dei Servi, Bologna
	Castelfiorentino Madonna	Tempera and gold on wood	Museo di Santa Verdiana, Castelfiorentino
	Virgin and Child with Angels and St. Francis	Fresco	Lower Basilica, Saint Francis of Assisi
	Angels (now lost)	Fresco	Upper Basilica, Saint Francis of Assisi
	The Death of the Virgin	Fresco	Upper Basilica, Saint Francis of Assisi
	Dormition of the Virgin	Fresco	Upper Basilica, Saint Francis of Assisi
	Assumption of the Virgin	Fresco	Upper Basilica, Saint Francis of Assisi
	Christ and the Virgin Enthroned	Fresco	Upper Basilica, Saint Francis of Assisi
	Cruxifiction (left)	Fresco	Upper Basilica, Saint Francis of Assisi
	Cruxifiction (right)	Fresco	Upper Basilica, Saint Francis of Assisi
	Vision of St. John on Patmos	Fresco	Upper Basilica, Saint Francis of Assisi
	Angels at the Four Corners of the Earth	Fresco	Upper Basilica, Saint Francis of Assisi
	Vision of the Golden Throne	Fresco	Upper Basilica, Saint Francis of Assisi
	Fall of Babylon	Fresco	Upper Basilica, Saint Francis of Assisi
	St. Michael and the Dragon (now lost)	Fresco	Upper Basilica, Saint Francis of Assisi
	Apocalyptical Christ	Fresco	Upper Basilica, Saint Francis of Assisi
	The Fall of Simon Magnus	Fresco	Upper Basilica, Saint Francis of Assisi
	Martyrdom of St. Peter	Fresco	Upper Basilica, Saint Francis of Assisi
	Martyrdom of St. Paul	Fresco	Upper Basilica, Saint Francis of Assisi
	St. Paul Healing the Crippled Man	Fresco	Upper Basilica, Saint Francis of Assisi
	St. Paul Expelling Demons	Fresco	Upper Basilica, Saint Francis of Assisi
	The Four Evangelists	Fresco	Upper Basilica, Saint Francis of Assisi
	Santa Trinita Maestà	Tempera and gold on wood	Uffizi, Florence
	St. John (detail of apse mosaic)	Mosaic	Pisa Cathedral
