= Beata Vergine Addolorata =

Coordinates: 45°19′25″N 8°51′10″E

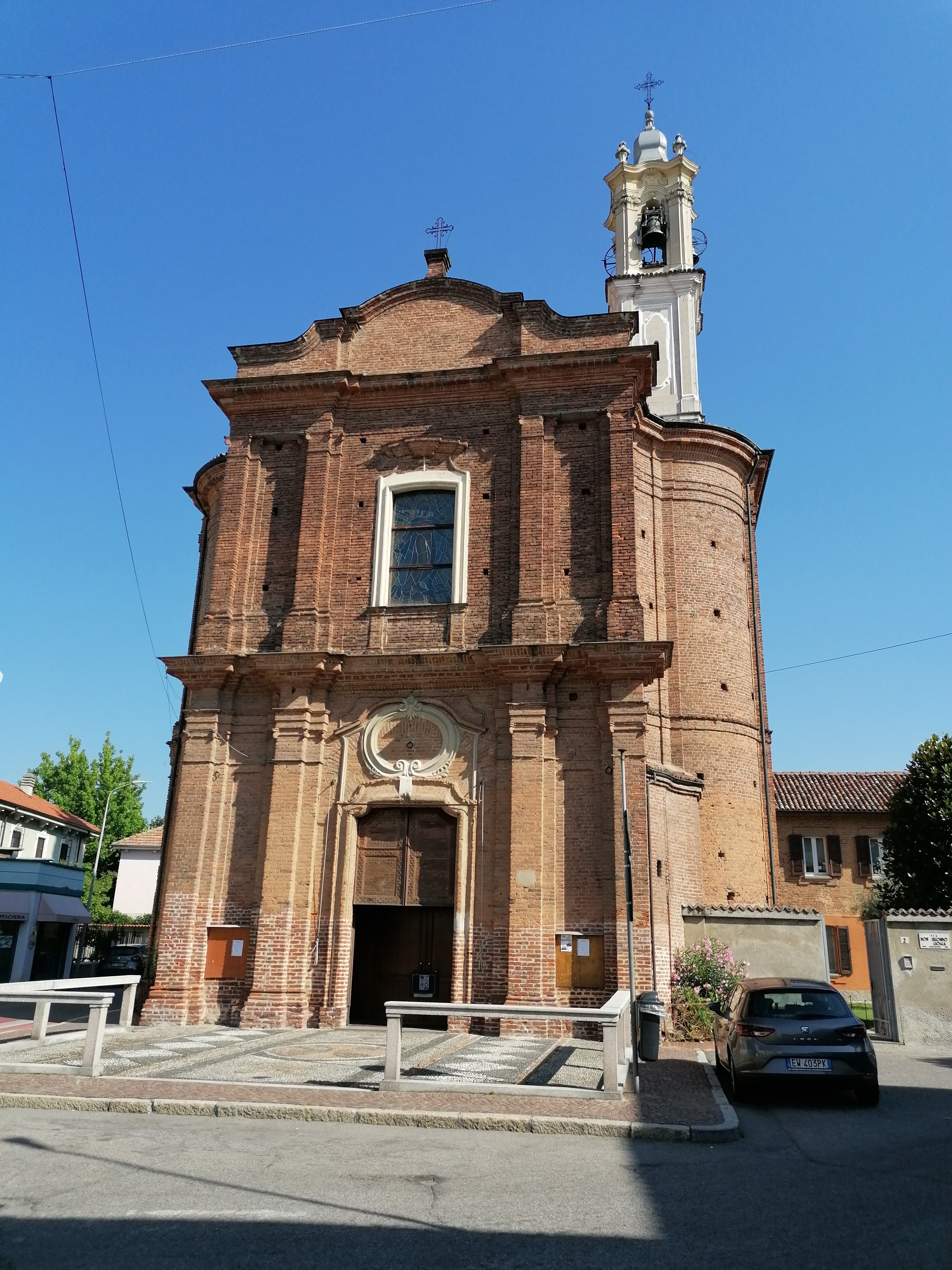
The church

The Church of Beata Vergine Addolorata is a religious building located in Vigevano, in province of Pavia and diocese of Vigevano, Italy.

== History and description ==
The first stone of the church was laid by bishop Giorgio Odescalchi on 3 May 1613. Originally it was a small chapel located outside Porta di Cicerino, or Porta Cesarea. The Confraternity of the Seven Sorrows was established in the church in 1657 on the orders of the bishop Pier Marino Sormani. Having declared the old chapel insufficient, in 1699 the brotherhood had part of the building demolished in order to be able to expand it. The new construction was completed in 1722.

In 1805 it was suppressed during the Napoleonic revolts; however, the brothers managed to purchase a good part of the objects present inside and the church itself, without suffering serious damage and opening it illegally starting from 1812. It was subsequently reopened for worship and repainted by Giovanni Battista Garberini.

It has a single Greek cross nave, a large neoclassical main altar and a dead Christ. Inside there is a statue depicting the Madonna of the Seven Sorrows, coming from the church of Misericordia. There are also four sixteenth-century paintings donated by bishop Odescalchi. Numerous art objects come from churches that disappeared during the Napoleonic looting of art. The church preserves a nativity scene from 1800.
