= Madonna and Child Enthroned with John the Baptist and Mary Magdalene =

Painting by Cima da Conegliano

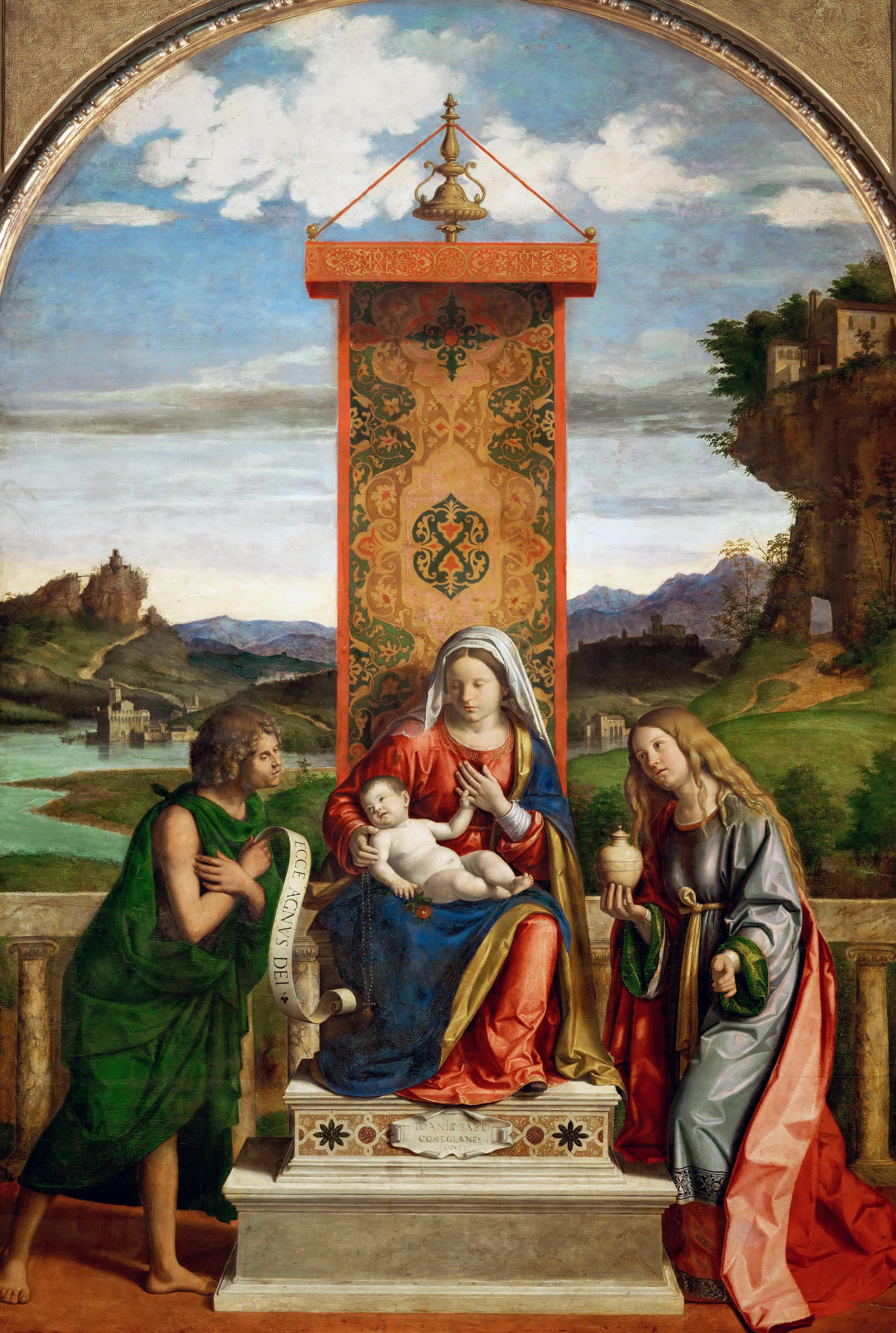
Madonna and Child Enthroned with John the Baptist and Mary Magdalene (1511–1513) by Cima da Conegliano

Madonna and Child Enthroned with John the Baptist and Mary Magdalene is a 1511–1513 oil on panel painting by Cima da Conegliano. Originally in the monastery church of San Domenico in Parma, it was seized by the French occupiers in 1811 and taken to Paris, remaining there after the Congress of Vienna and still in the collections of the Louvre.
