= The Baptism of Christ (Rubens) =

Painting by Peter Paul Rubens

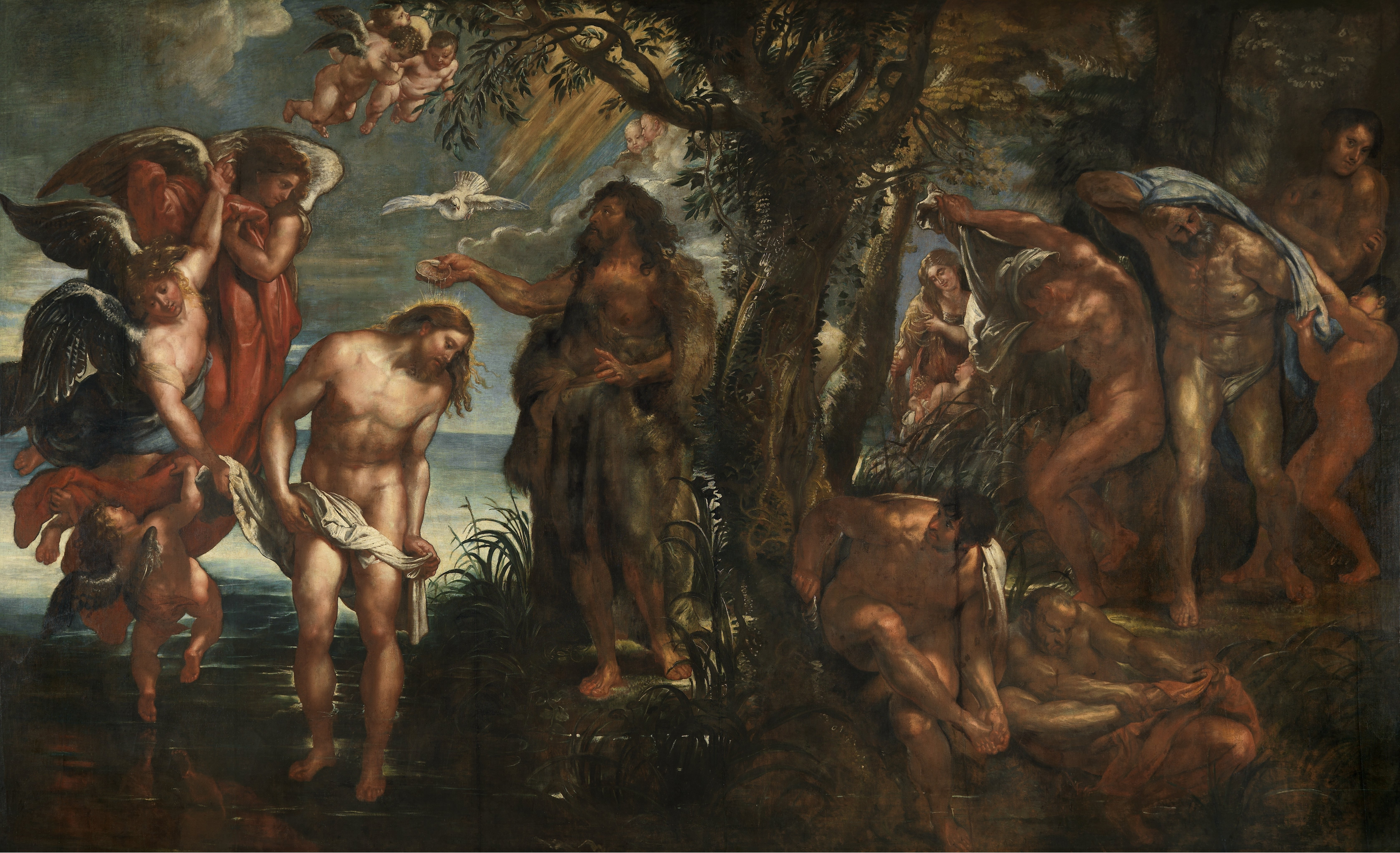
- Artist: Peter Paul Rubens
- Year: 1604-05
- Medium: Oil on canvas
- Dimensions: 411 cm × 675 cm (162 in × 266 in)
- Location: Royal Museum of Fine Arts, Antwerp

The Baptism of Christ is an oil on canvas painting by Peter Paul Rubens, executed in 1604–1605. It depicts John the Baptist baptizing Jesus Christ in the Jordan river. Originally commissioned by the Jesuit Church in Mantua as an altarpiece along with two other paintings, it is now owned by the Royal Museum of Fine Arts Antwerp. Rubens' earliest sketches depicting the poses of John the Baptist and Christ in this scene were probably done in 1601.
