= Napoleonic looting of art =

Seizure of art from conquered territory by Napoleonic France

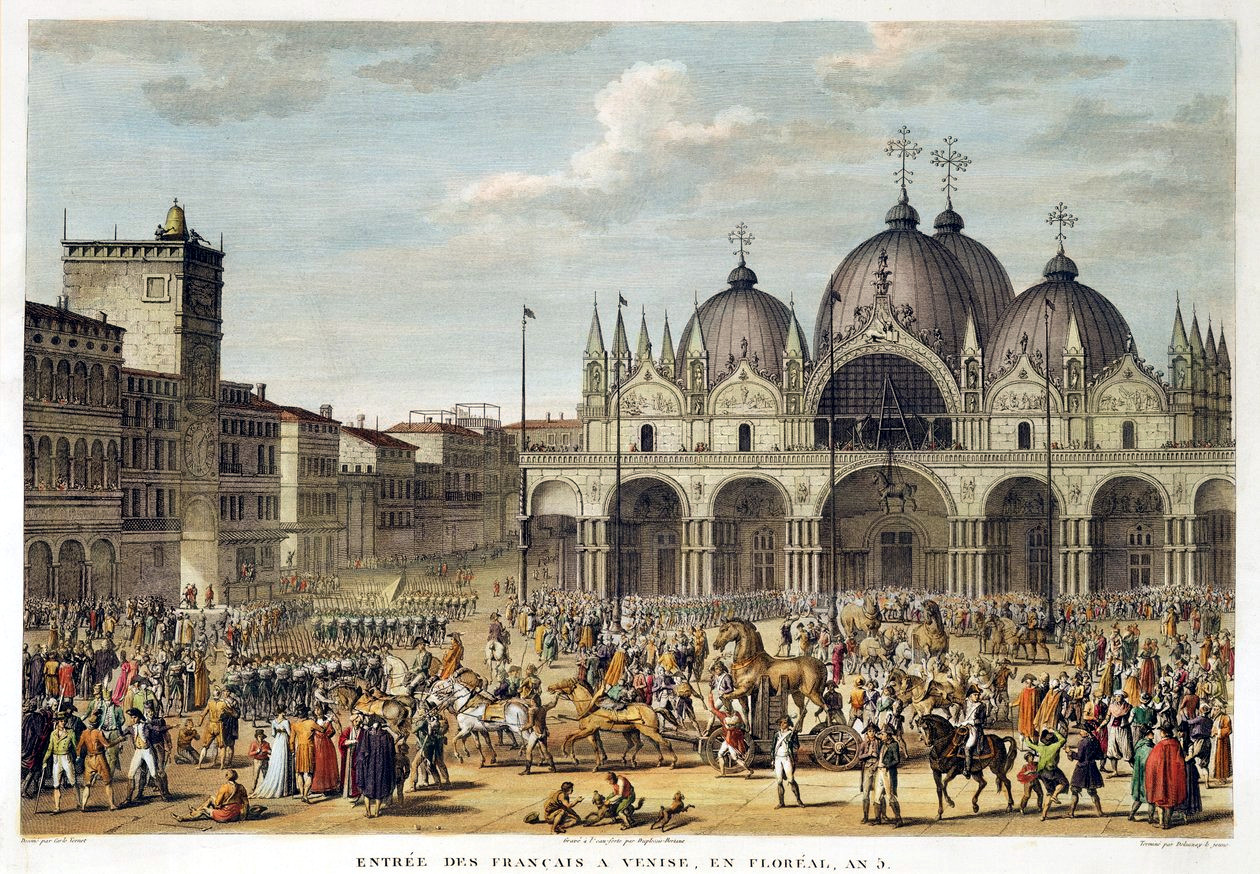
Removal of the Horses of Saint Mark from St Mark's Basilica in Venice, by Carle Vernet and Jean Duplessis-Bertaux, 1797

Napoleonic looting of art (French: Spoliations napoléoniennes) consisted of the confiscation of artworks and precious objects carried out by French troops and officials in the conquered territories of the French Republic and Empire, including the Italian Peninsula, Spain, Portugal, the Low Countries, and Central Europe. The looting began around 1794 and continued through Napoleon I's rule of France, until the Congress of Vienna in 1815 ordered the restitution of the works.

During the Napoleonic era, an unknown but immense quantity of art was acquired, destroyed, or lost through treaties, public auctions, and unsanctioned seizures. Coins and objects made of precious metals, such as the Jewel of Vicenza and the bucentaur, the Venetian state barge, were melted down for easier sale and transport, to finance French military wages. In the confusion, many artworks and manuscripts were lost in transit or broken into pieces, which were often never reunited, as occurred with the marble columns of the Aachen Cathedral.

French officials justified taking art and other objects of value as both a right of conquest and as an advancement of public education, encyclopedism, and Enlightenment ideals. These seizures redefined the right of conquest in Europe and caused a surge of interest in art and art conservation.

At the Congress of Vienna, Austria, Spain, the German states, and the United Kingdom ordered the restitution of all the removed artworks. Many were returned, but others remained in France, due to resistance from the French administration, the high costs of transport, or the risk of damage to fragile works. As not all of the artwork was returned, this campaign of French looting continues to affect European politics, museology, and national cultural identity today. Also the "finds" of Napoleon's Egyptian campaign, such as the Rosetta Stone, were not concerned by the arrangement and remained in the British Museum.

== History ==
=== Background ===
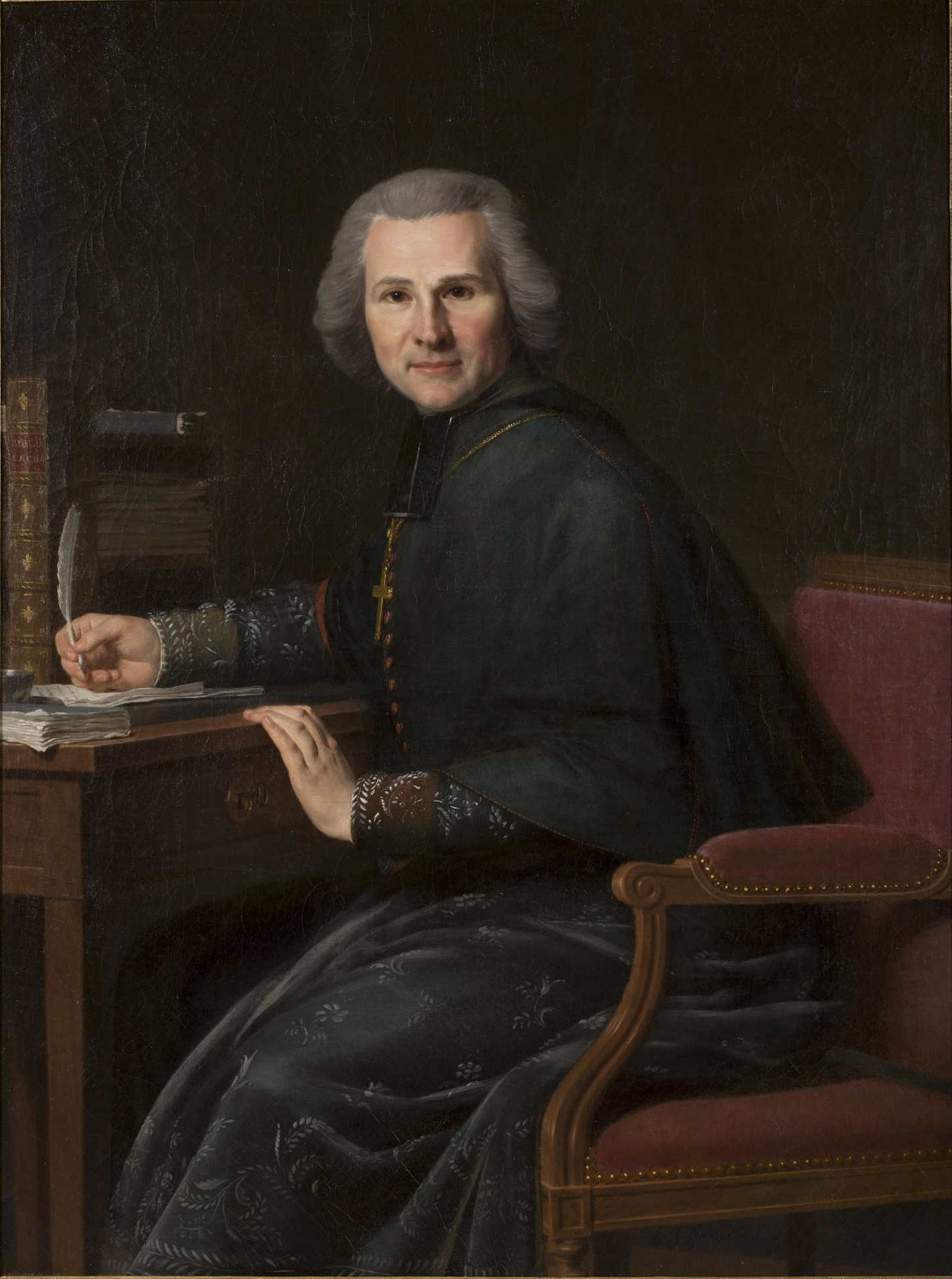
Henri Grégoire

After the French Revolution, the new government had to decide whether or how to nationalise artworks from churches, the fleeing nobility of the ancien régime, and the royal collections. In some cases, French iconoclasts destroyed artworks, particularly those that represented royalty or feudalism. Other works were put up for public auction to replenish the Republic's empty coffers and were bought and transported to other European collections.

With the intervention of abbot Henri Gregoire in 1794, the French revolutionary government moved to stop the vandalism and destruction of artworks by claiming them as a source of national heritage. All around France, works were placed in storage or for display in museums, like the Louvre, and enormous inventories of the confiscated works were attempted. Regional French museums resisted attempts at centralised control of their collections, but the newly instituted French Directory created commissions to encourage compliance. In many cases, this saved works of medieval or Gothic art from destruction, often through the intervention of experts like architect Alexandre Lenoir, abbot Nicolas Bergeat, and artist Louis Joseph Watteau.

From the start of the 18th century, the French people had clamoured for more public exhibitions, creating a need for new artworks and their display. And the increased collections needed new institutions to manage them. The Musée des Monuments Français, whose collection would later be transferred to the Louvre, and the Museum of Fine Arts of Lyon are two prominent examples of art museums. Science museums were also founded, including the Conservatoire national des arts et métiers and the Muséum national d'histoire naturelle.

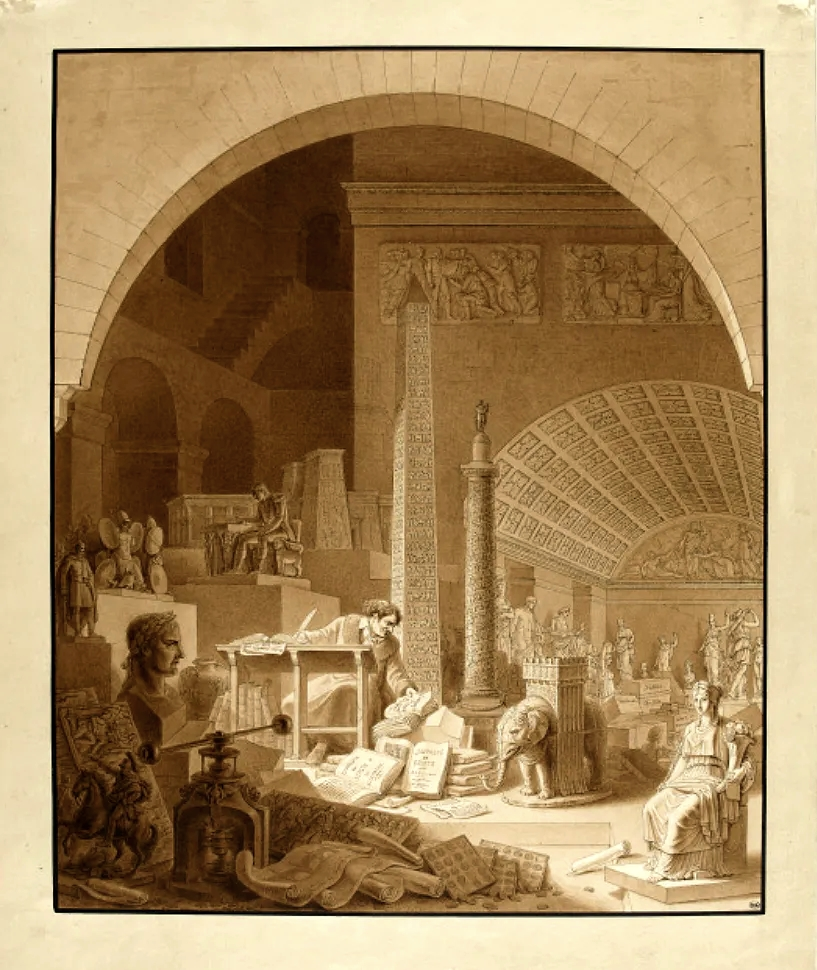
Vivant Denon working at the room of Diana at the Louvre, by Benjamin Zix, 1811

The previously disorganised Louvre collection was cataloged and structured through the work of scholars Ennio Quirino Visconti and Alexandre Lenoir. In November 1802, First Consul Napoleon Bonaparte appointed Vivant Denon director of the Louvre, the museums of Versailles, and the royal castle collections due to his successes in the Egyptian campaign. Denon, known as "Napoleon's eye", continued to travel with French military expeditions to Italy, Germany, Austria, and Spain to select artworks for France. He also improved the Louvre's layout and lighting to encourage holistic comparisons of the plundered artworks, reflecting new ideas in museology and countering the objections that the artworks lacked meaningful context in France. Denon "deployed flattery and duplicity" to gain further acquisitions, even against Napoleon's wishes. As a result of the Chaptal Decree in 1801, works of greater merit were selected for the Louvre, while less important works were distributed among new French provincial museums like those in Lyon or Marseille, and then to smaller museums like those in Reims, Tours, or Arles. At the same time, some Italian fine arts academies were transformed into public museums like the Pinacoteca di Brera in Milan.

The influx of paintings also coincided with renewed interest in art restoration methods, under the influence of restorers Robert Picault and François-Toussaint Hacquin. Many of the works had never been cleaned and needed repair from transportation. Some paintings were restored or altered, such as Raphael's Madonna of Foligno, which was transferred from its original panel to a canvas support in c. 1800. In 1798, the Louvre actually exhibited a painting by Pietro Perugino that was only half restored to demonstrate the repairs to the public. These new cultural preservation methods were then used to justify the seizure and alterations of foreign cultural objects.

The French Army's removal of murals and frescoes was related to French conservators' tradition of transferring paintings onto new supports. They saw the detachment of wall paintings as no different than moving a wooden altarpiece from its place. Some of the radical treatments were difficult to execute successfully. In 1800, French officials tried to remove the Deposition, by Daniele da Volterra, from the Orsini chapel of Rome's Trinità dei Monti church. The stacco a massello technique—which removed part of the mural's plaster support—undermined the walls of the chapel, and the removal had to be halted to prevent the chapel from caving in. The mural itself had to be extensively restored by Pietro Palmaroli and was never sent to Paris.

=== Justifications for seizures ===
The French government planned to increase museum collections through the confiscation of foreign artworks as a show of national strength. Its appropriations were at first indiscriminate, but by 1794, the French government developed structured programs for art acquisition through its wars. With its "savant" system, exemplified by the Commission des Sciences et des Arts, experts would select which works should be taken—the system tried to reconcile imperial tribute with the French values of encyclopedism and public education. Its work was supported by peace treaties designed to legitimise their acquisitions: some treaty clauses required the delivery of artworks, and others imposed art acquisitions as tribute from foreign nobility.

In European history, the plundering of artworks had been a common, accepted way for conquerors to exhibit power over their new subjects. In the late 18th century, however, the increased national control of artworks led to regulations that restricted the movement and sale of artworks; and the ideals of enlightened monarchs discouraged treating art as mere plunder.

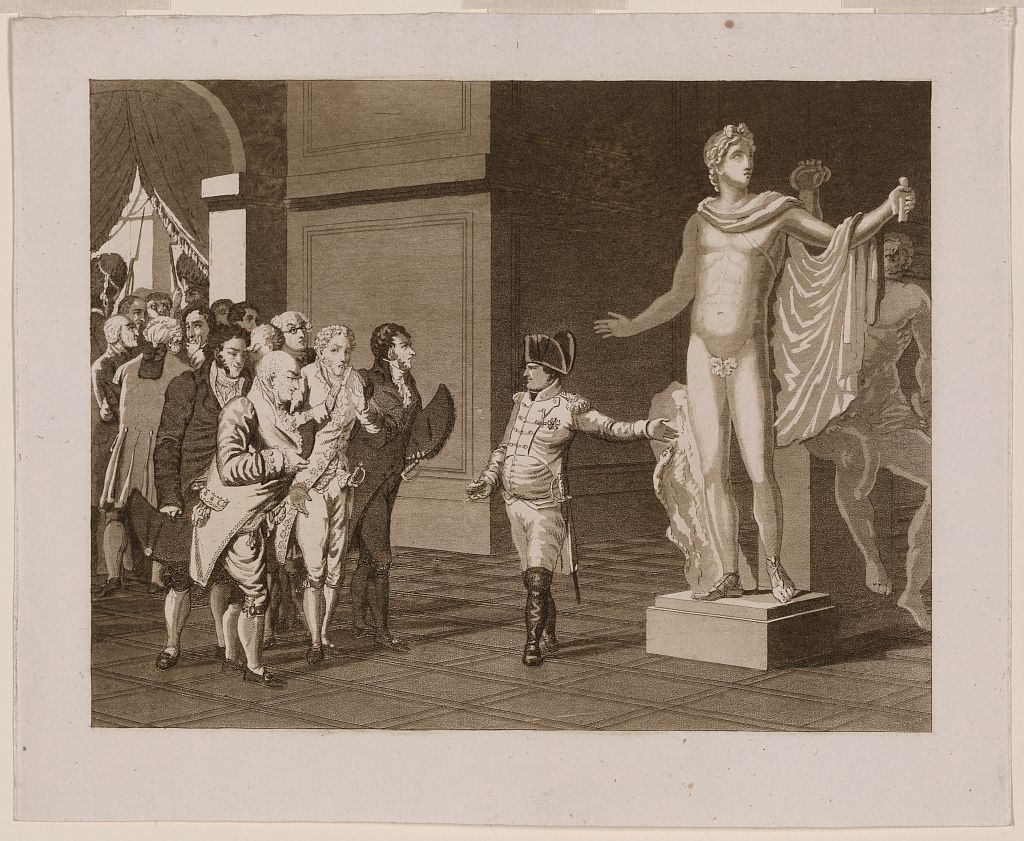
Napoleon showing off the Apollo Belvedere and Laocoön group, French aquatint, 1797

Still, the French justified their seizures by appealing to the right of conquest and republican ideals of artistic appreciation, as well as the advancement of scientific knowledge and the "scientific cosmopolitanism" of the Republic of Letters. Nord Jacques-Luc Barbier-Walbonne, a Hussar lieutenant, proclaimed before the National Assembly that the works had remained "soiled too long by slavery", and that "these immortal works are no longer on foreign soil. They are brought to the homeland of arts and genius, to the homeland of liberty and sacred equality: the French Republic." Bishop Henri Gregoire said before the Convention in 1794: "If our victorious armies have entered Italy, the removal of the Apollo Belvedere and the Farnese Hercules should be the most brilliant conquest. It is Greece that decorated Rome: why should the masterpieces of the Greek republic decorate a country of slaves? The French Republic should be their final resting place." This rhetoric contrasted the republican values of revolutionary France against the European monarchies that relied on serfdom, feudalism, and exploitative colonialism to argue that other countries were incapable of properly caring for their own culture (Although, the French Republic still held Haiti as a slave colony at this time.).

One of Quatremère de Quincy's tracts on the ethics of art display, 1815

Quatremère de Quincy, a student of Johann Joachim Winckelmann and others like him, believed artworks should not be removed from their original context. Beginning in 1796, Quatremère argued against art appropriation. To rediscover the art of the past, he said it would be necessary to "turn to the ruins of Provence, investigate the ruins of Arles, Orange, and restore the beautiful amphitheater of Nîmes", instead of looting Rome. Although Quatremère supported centralised cultural knowledge, he believed that uprooting art from its original context as French officials were doing would hopelessly compromise its authentic meaning, creating new meanings instead.

Quatremère's views were in the minority in France, but the conquered nations made appeals along similar lines. In occupied Belgium, there were popular protests against art expropriation, and the Central and Superior Administration of Belgium tried to block French acquisitions. The administration argued that Belgians shouldn't be treated as conquered subjects but "children of the Republic". In Florence, the director of the Uffizi argued that the galleries' collection was already owned by the people of Tuscany, rather than the Grand Duke who signed a treaty with the French. These appeals were sometimes supported by French officials. For example, Charles Nicolas Lacretelle argued that taking Italian art in excess would push Italians to support Habsburg rule.

=== The Low Countries and the Rhineland ===
During and after their successful war against the First Coalition (1792–97), the French armies destroyed monuments, supported iconoclasm, and held art auctions of confiscated property in the Low Countries of northwestern Europe. French armies began claiming property from within the newly formed Batavian Republic, including from the collection of the House of Orange at The Hague. Their efforts were led by Hussar lieutenant Nord Jacques-Luc Barbier-Walbonne, under the advice of artist and collector Jean-Baptiste Wicar. In 1794, three paintings by Peter Paul Rubens, along with around 5,000 books from the University of Leuven, were sent from Antwerp to Paris, and the first shipment arrived in that September. The Louvre received around 200 Flemish old-master paintings: they included 55 paintings by Rubens and 18 by Rembrandt, as well as the Proserpina sarcophagus and several marble columns from Aachen Cathedral. Despite the anti-clericalism of France at the time, Flemish artwork with religious subjects were welcomed by Parisian authorities.

In early 1795, France conquered Holland, and one of the "savant" commissions—comprising botanist André Thouin, geologist Barthélemy Faujas de St-Fond, antiquarian Michel Le Blond, and architect Charles de Wailly—accessed the collection of Stadholder William V, who had fled. However, the status of the Batavian Republic as a "sister republic" of France made acquisitions difficult to justify. In March 1795, French officials exempted all Batavian private property from seizure, except for the Stadholder's, because he had been so unpopular. With the Stadholder's collection designated as private property and eligible for appropriation, four shipments of natural history artifacts (minerals, stuffed animals, books, etc.) and 24 paintings were sent to Paris in the late spring of 1795.

As Thouin described the selection works both as tribute and as a way to enforce cultural dependence upon France:

This tribute by a vanquished power will contribute much to perpetuate the glory of the victors, and make the neighboring powers tributary of France by forcing its subjects to draw on France for useful knowledge. It is undoubtedly the least expensive tribute to extract from the conquered, the most dignifying for the great people who impose it, the most fruitful for the goodness of humanity, a goal which any good government should never lose sight of.

The commission process set a pattern for the systematic appropriations to come, and the French use of experts explains how they could select important Old Master artworks and discern them from copies and pieces made by artists' workshops. The first French exhibitions of the Low Country artworks took place in 1799, and included 56 works by Rubens, 18 by Rembrandt, Jan van Eyck's Ghent Altarpiece, and 12 portraits by Hans Holbein the Younger. From 1801 on, the French officials in charge of the new Belgian art institutions tried to resist any further export of the artworks.

=== Italy ===
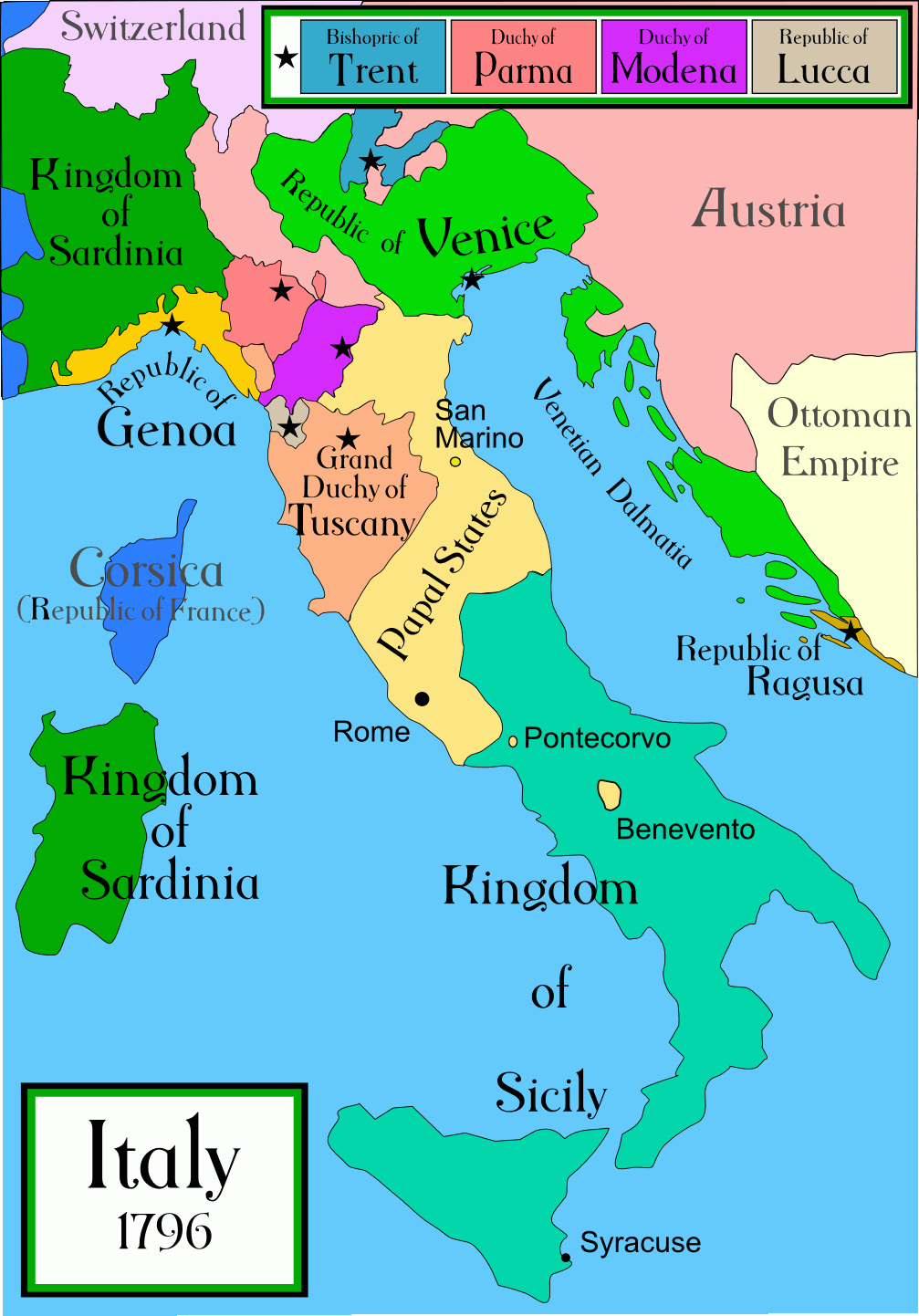
Italy in 1796

In Italy, the practice of using special commissions to select art for appropriation was expanded and made more systematic. The librarians of the Bibliothèque Nationale had compiled extensive lists of the Italian books they desired. The commission included scientists Claude Louis Berthollet, Pierre Claude François Daunou, and Gaspard Monge; and artists Jacques-Pierre Tinet, Jean-Baptiste Wicar, Andrea Appiani, and Jean-Baptiste Moitte. In Lombardy, the Veneto, and Emilia-Romagna, commission members had the authority to select and acquire works at their own discretion. On May 7, 1796, the French Directorate ordered Napoleon to transfer goods from the occupied territories in Italy to France:

General citizen, the executive directorate is convinced that the glory of art and that of the army under your orders are inseparable. Italy owes art the greater part of its riches and its fame, but the time of French rule has come, to consolidate and beautify the kingdom of liberty. The national museum should hold all celebrated artistic monuments, and you will not fail to enrich it with what awaits it from the armed conquest of Italy and those that the future still holds. This glorious campaign, as well as allowing the Republic to offer peace to its enemies, should repair the devastating vandalisms by adding to the splendor of military victories the enchantment of consoling and beneficial art.

Napoleon himself had close ties to Italy, which inspired both his imperial ambitions and his appreciation for its art. French rule was also more welcomed than it had been in the Low Countries, especially among Italian intellectuals, which gave the appropriations some popular support. Regions that were either favourable to French rule—such as those that eventually formed the Cisalpine Republic,—or were geographically hard to reach, had fewer works of art taken from them. Regions that actively fought the French, such as Parma and Venice, had the transfer of artworks written as a condition of their surrender. The French armies also dissolved monasteries and convents as they went, often taking artworks that had been abandoned or sold in haste.

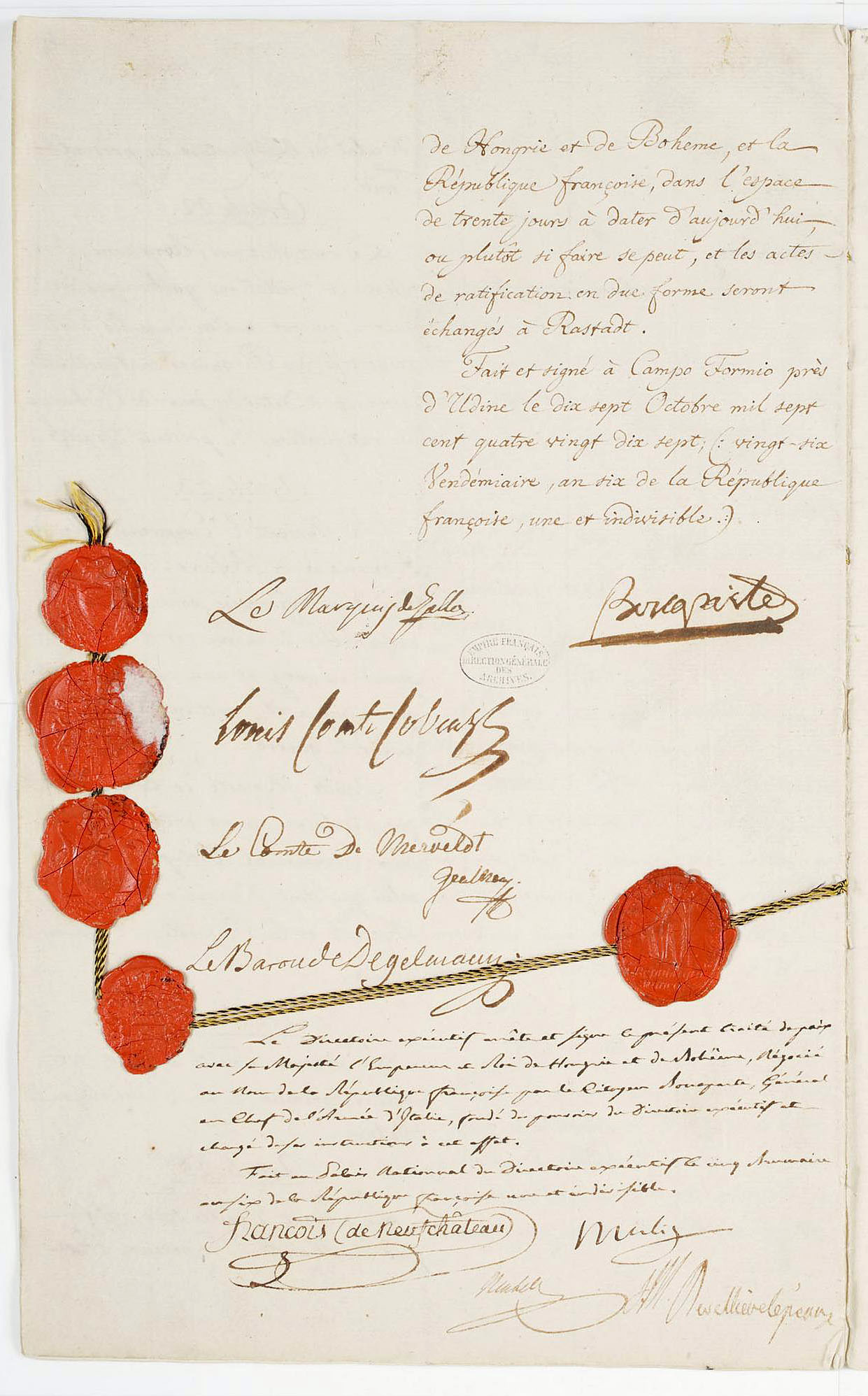
Last page of the 1797 Treaty of Campo Formio, with signatures

From the spring of 1796, the first Napoleonic campaign in Italy removed art objects of all kinds, which were sanctioned in provisions of the Treaty of Leoben, the Armistice of Cherasco, the Armistice of Bologna, and the Treaty of Tolentino, culminating with clauses in the 1797 Treaty of Campo Formio that transferred artworks from the Austria and the former Venetian Republic. Over 110 artworks were brought to France in 1796 alone. The early appropriations were organised by Jean-Baptiste Wicar. Drawing on his experience of cataloging the art collections of Italian duchies, Wicar selected which paintings would be sent to Paris from 1797 to 1800. His work was continued later by Vivant Denon. Local nobles, like Giovanni Battista Sommariva, used the opportunity of the tumult to enrich their own personal collections.

During the occupations, Napoleonic officials continued to plunder artwork beyond that agreed to in the treaties—the commission had permission to amend the agreed number of artworks. Resistance to these appropriations was decentralised, or sometimes nonexistent, because Italy did not yet exist as a single nation.

==== Kingdom of Sardinia ====
With the Armistice of Cherasco in May 1796, more than 67 Italian and Flemish artworks fell to France. Turin was made a part of French territory, and the negotiations were particularly cordial. Fewer works were taken from Sardinia (which was ruled by the House of Savoy from Turin at the time), although French attention turned to the documents, the codices of the Regal Archive, and Flemish paintings in the Galleria Sabauda.

==== Austrian Lombardy ====
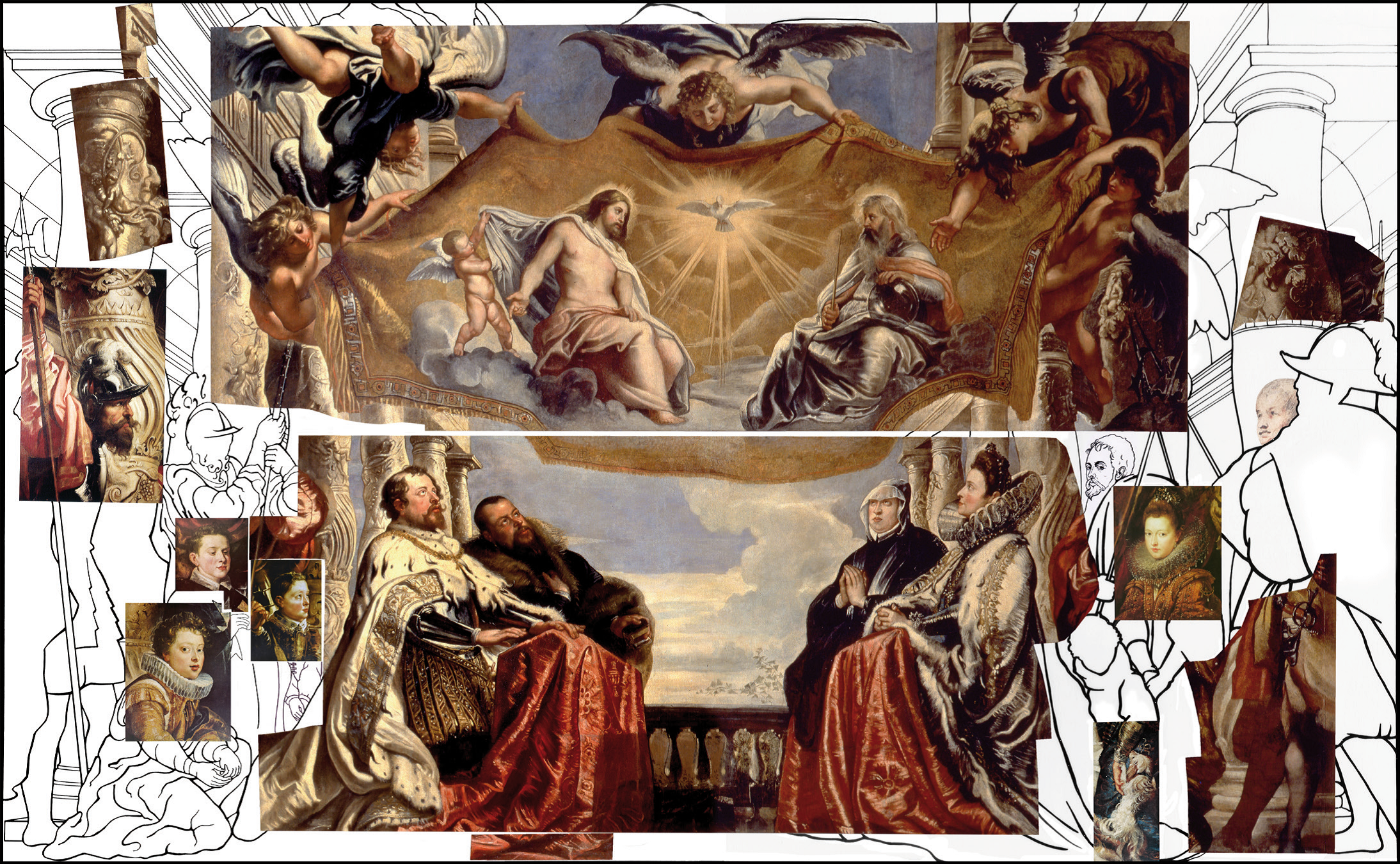
Reconstruction of The Gonzaga Family in Adoration of the Holy Trinity, which was cut apart by French soldiers

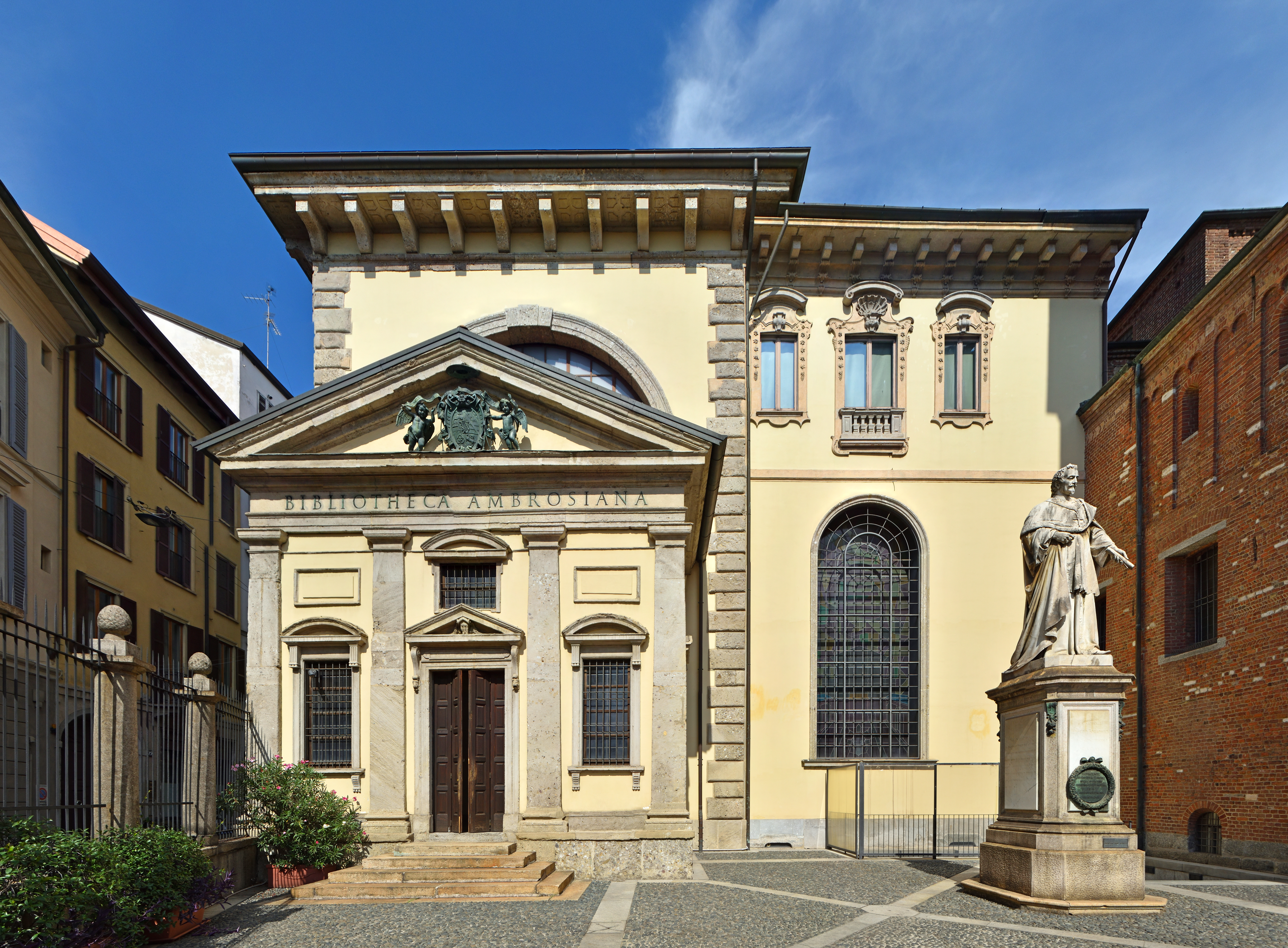
The exterior of the Biblioteca Ambrosiana

The French entered Milan in 1796, as part of the first Italian campaign of Napoleon in Lombardy. In May 1796, while there was still fighting at Castello Sforzesco, Tinet traveled to the Biblioteca Ambrosiana as a member of the French commission. There, Tinet took Raphael's preparatory drawings for The School of Athens fresco at the Vatican; 12 drawings and the Codex Atlanticus of Leonardo da Vinci; the precious manuscripts of the Bucolics of the Virgin, with illuminations by Simone Martini; and five landscapes of Jan Brueghel for Carlo Borromeo that had been placed in the Ambrosiana of Milan in 1673. The Coronation of Thorns, by a follower of Titian between 1542 and 1543, commissioned by the monks of the Church of Santa Maria delle Graces, was sent to the Louvre. Many works were also taken from the Pinacoteca di Brera and the cathedral of Mantua. From the Mantuan church of Santa Trinità, three Rubens works, The Baptism of Christ, The Gonzaga Trinity, and the Transfiguration were taken to Paris.

The Codex Atlanticus was eventually returned, in pieces, to the Biblioteca Ambrosiana. In fact, many folios of the Codex are stored in Nantes and Basel, while all the other notebooks and writings of Leonardo are at the National Library of France, in Paris.

==== Modena ====
The armistice between Napoleon and the Duke of Modena was signed in May 1796, in Milan by San Romano Federico d'Este, representative of Duke Ercole III. France demanded 20 paintings from the Este Collection and a monetary sum triple that of the Parma armistice. The first shipment was sent by Giuseppe Maria Soli, director of the Accademia Atestina di Belle Arti.

On 14 October 1796, Napoleon entered Modena with two new commissioners, Pierre-Anselme Garrau and Antoine Christophe Saliceti, to sift through Modena's galleries of medals, and the ducal palace for collections of cameos and engraved semi-precious stones. On 17 October, after taking many manuscripts and antique books from the ducal library, they shipped 1213 items: 900 bronze imperial Roman coins, 124 coins from Roman colonies, 10 silver coins, 31 shaped medals, 44 coins from the Greek cities, and 103 Papal coins. All were sent to the Bibliothèque nationale of Paris, where they still reside.

In February 1797, Napoleon's wife Joséphine took up residence at the Ducal Palace of Modena and wished to see the collection of cameos and precious stones. She took around 200 of them, in addition to those taken by her husband. French officials also sent 1300 drawings found in the Este collections to the Louvre, as well as 16 agate cameos, 51 precious stones, and many crystal vases.

==== Parma, Piacenza, and Guastalla ====
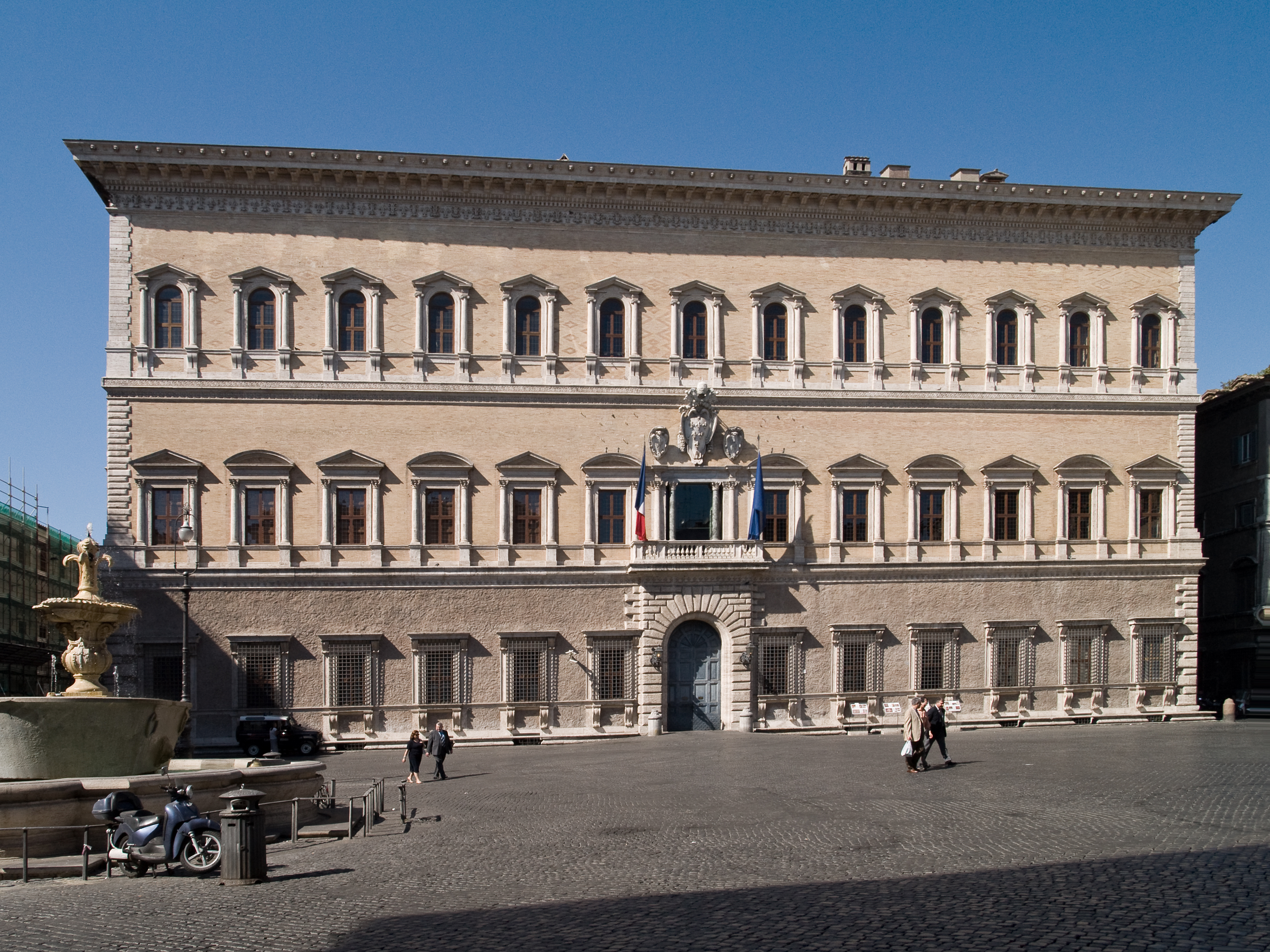
Exterior of the Palazzo Farnese, which is currently a French embassy

With the armistice of 9 May 1796, the Duke of Parma, Piacenza, and Guastalla was forced to send 20 paintings, later reduced to 16, selected by French officials. In Piacenza, the officials chose two canvases from the Cathedral of Parma—The Funeral of the Virgin and The Apostles at the Tomb of the Virgin, by Ludovico Carracci—to be sent to the Louvre. In 1803, by order of the administrator Moreau de Saint Mery, the carvings and decorations of the Palazzo Farnese, as well as the painting The Spanish Coronation, were removed. Two paintings were taken from the duomo, those by Giovanni Lanfranco of saints Alessio and Corrado. Ettore Rota published tables of all the art taken: 55 works from the Duke of Parma, Piacenza, and Guastalla, and 8 bronze objects of Veleja, of which 30 works and the 8 bronzes were eventually returned. Saint Corrado by Lanfranco and The Spanish Coronation remain in France, where they are on display. The remaining works are missing.

In Parma, after the 1803 orders and the creation of the French Taro department in 1808, more precious objects were stripped from the Ducal archaeological museum, such as Tabula Alimentaria Traianea and Lex Rubria de Gallia Cisalpina. One department prefect complained, after the departure of Vivant Denon, that "there remains nothing to serve as models for the schools of painting in Parma."

==== Venetian Republic ====
The French search for Venetian artworks was led by Monge, Berthollet, artist Jean-Simon Berthélemy, and Tinet, who had previously been in Modena. After the defeat of the Venetian Republic, there were several revolts against the occupying French armies. The resulting reprisals and confiscations were particularly harsh. Gold and silver works from the Zecca of Venice and the Basilica di San Marco were melted down and sent to France or used to pay soldiers' salaries. Religious orders were abolished, and some 70 churches were demolished. Around 30,000 works of art were sold or went missing.

The Bucintoro, the Venetian state barge, was taken apart along with all its sculptures, much of which was then burned on the island of San Giorgio Maggiore to extract their gold leaf; the Arsenal of Venice was dismantled, and the most beautiful arms, armour, and firearms were sent to France, with the rest (including more than 5,000 cannons) being melted down. The weapons shipped to France were mostly placed in the collection of the Musée de l'Armée, including a bronze cannon made to celebrate an alliance between the Republic of Venice and Denmark–Norway.

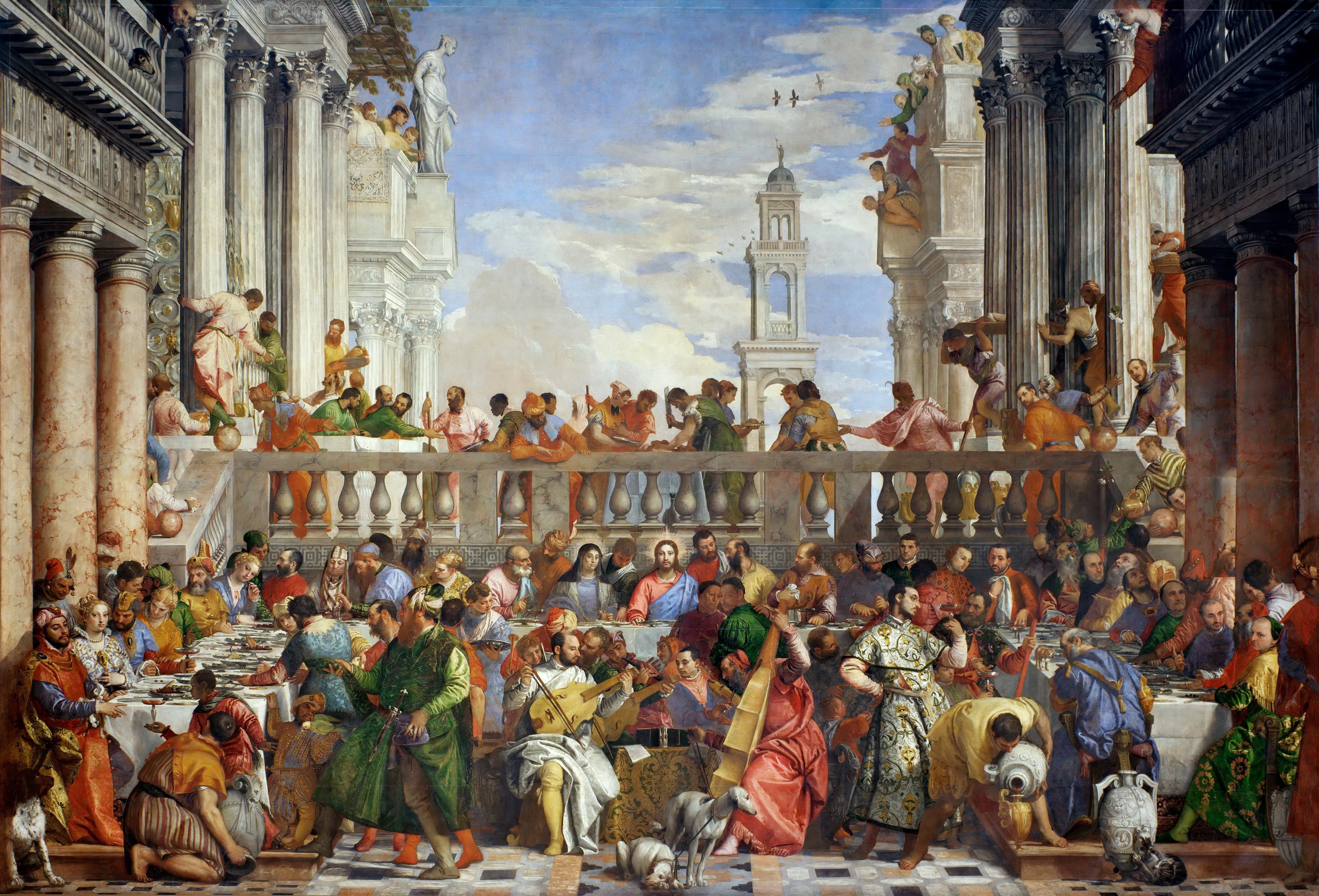
The Wedding at Cana, taken from the Benedictine refectory on the island San Giorgio Maggiore, now in the Louvre

The Wedding at Cana, by Paolo Veronese, was cut in two and sent to the Louvre (where it remains). The San Zeno Altarpiece, by Andrea Mantegna, was cut apart and sent as well. Its platforms remain in the Louvre while the principal panel was returned to Verona, thus destroying the work's integrity. Giovanni Battista Gazola's renowned collection of fossils from Mount Bolca was confiscated in May 1797 and deposited in the Museum of Natural History in Paris that September. Gazola was retrospectively compensated with an annuity from 1797 and a pension from 1803. He created a second collection of fossils, which were also confiscated and brought to Paris in 1806.

In April 1797, the French removed the Lion of Saint Mark and famous bronze Horses of Saint Mark. When Napoleon decided to commemorate his victories of 1805 and 1807, he ordered the construction of the Arc de Triomphe du Carrousel and that the horses be placed on top as its only ornamentation.

==== Rome and the Papal States ====
After the Armistice of Bologna, the Papal States sent over 500 manuscripts and 100 artworks to France on the condition that the French Army would not occupy Rome. The Pope had to pay the costs of transporting the manuscripts and artworks to Paris. Commission member Jacques-Pierre Tinet took the Raphael altarpieces ceded by the armistice, but also an additional 31 paintings, a number of which were by Raphael and Perugino.

Tensions ran high between the French and the Romans. In August 1796, Roman rioters attacked French commissioners to protest the appropriations, and a French legate was assassinated. The Pope himself worked to undermine the clauses of the peace treaty and to delay the actual shipment of the works. When the French government sent him an ultimatum on September 8, 1797, the Pope declared the treaty and Armistice of Bologna null and void. When the Papal armies were defeated, Roman emissaries agreed to the harsher conditions of the Treaty of Tolentino. French officials seized art collections in Ravenna, Rimini, Pesaro, Ancona, and Perugia.

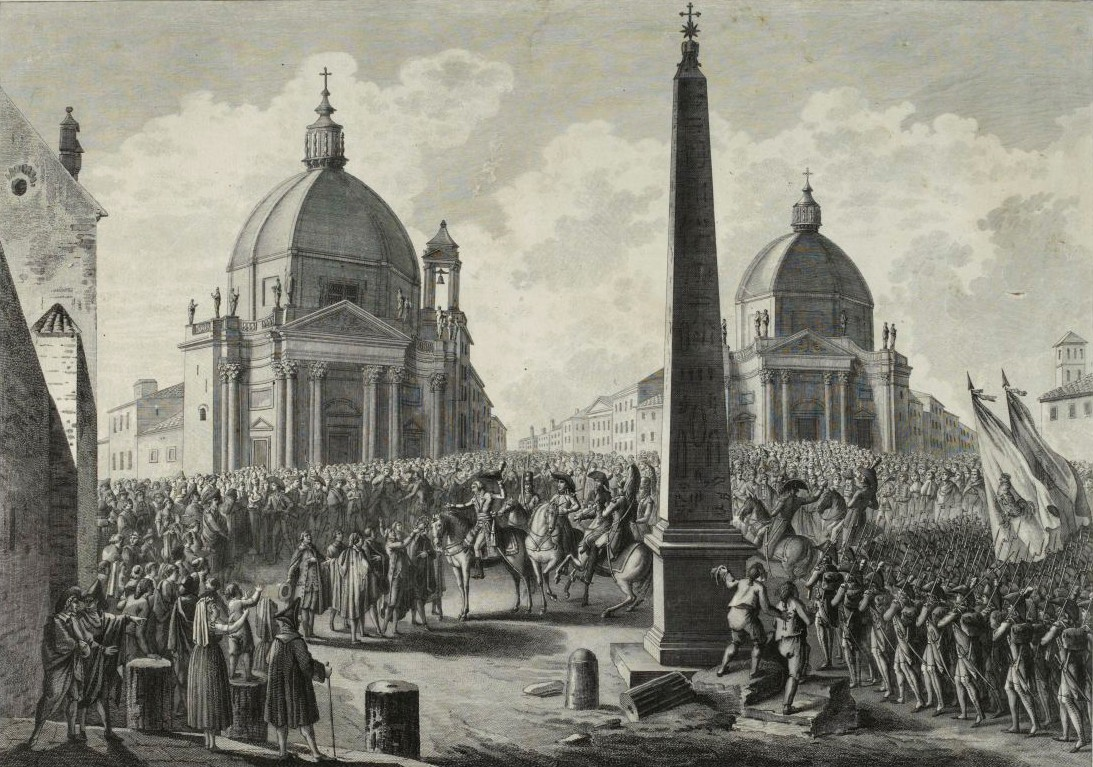
The French Army arriving in Rome in 1798

After French general Mathurin-Léonard Duphot was accidentally shot and killed outside the French embassy in December 1797, French armies occupied Rome, exiled Pope Pius VI, and established the short-lived Roman Republic. Although the public was assured that their monuments wouldn't be taken, French officials began systematically sacking the city after compiling an inventory of the Vatican's treasures.

Officials opened the Pope's rooms and fused Vatican medals of gold and silver for easier transportation. They tried to devise a way to remove the frescoes in the Vatican's Raphael Rooms. The artworks were chosen by Joseph de la Porte du Theil, a French intellectual who knew the Vatican library well. He took, among other things, the Fons Regina, the library of Queen Cristina of Sweden. Seizures also took place in the Vatican Library, the Biblioteca Estense of Modena, the libraries of Bologna, Monza, Pavia, and Brera. The private library of Pope Pius VI was seized by Pierre Claude François Daunou after it was put up for sale.

General Pommereul planned to remove Trajan's Column from Rome and send it to France, probably in pieces. This proposal was not acted on, however, due to the cost of transportation and the administrative obstacles created by the Church to slow the process.

For their anti-French advocacy, cardinals Giuseppe Albani and Romoaldo Braschi-Onesti had their collections seized, from the Villa Albani and the Palazzo Braschi, respectively. In May, Daunou wrote that the classical sculptures from Villa Albani filled over 280 crates, all to be sent to Paris. Swiss sculptor Heinrich Keller described the chaotic scene in Rome:

The destruction here is awful; the most beautiful pictures are sold for a song [...] The holier the subject, the lower the price. Yesterday I went to the Capitol, where the situation is dire. Marc Antony stands in a kitchen dressed with a heavy wooden neckpiece and straw gloves; the Dying Gaul is packed in straw and sack cloth to his toes; the beautiful Venus de' Medici is buried to her bosom in hay; while Flora waits buried in a wooden crate.

In 1809, collections of marbles were sold to Napoleon by Prince Camillo Borghese, who was under significant financial strain due to the heavy taxation imposed by the French. The prince didn't receive the promised sum, but was paid in land requisitioned from the Church and with mineral rights in Lazio. (Following the Congress of Vienna, the prince had to return all such compensation to their legitimate owners.)

==== Tuscany ====
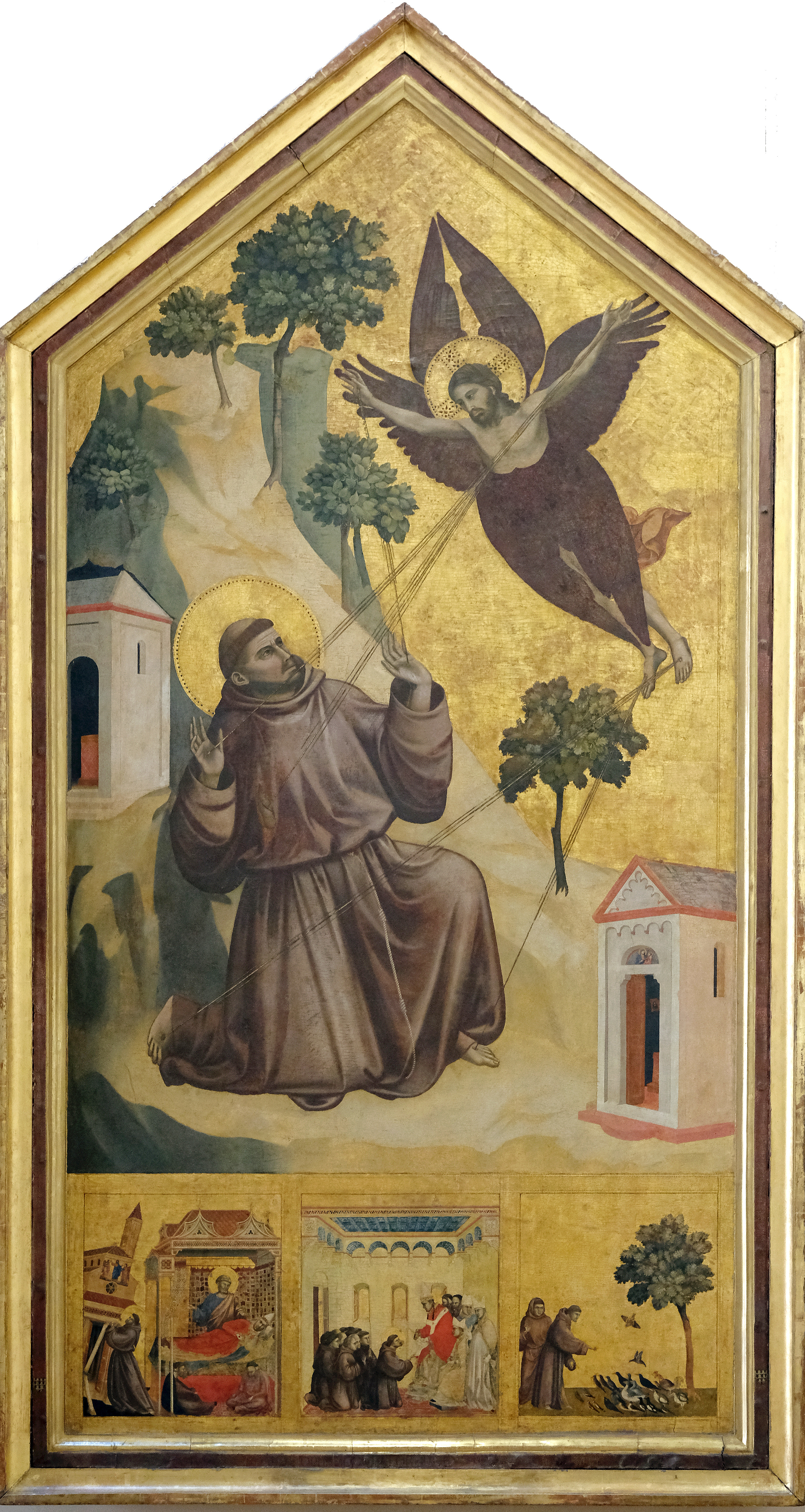
Saint Francis of Assisi Receiving the Stigmata by Giotto from Pisa, now at the Louvre

From March 1799, after Florence was occupied by the French armies, Jean-Baptiste Wicar chose which paintings would be taken from the Palazzo Pitti and sent to Paris. In total, 63 paintings and 25 pieces of pietre dure were taken from Florence. In 1803, the Venus de' Medici was exported to France at the express order of Napoleon.

The later looting of the Grand Duchy of Tuscany was led out by the director of the Louvre himself, Vivant Denon. Through the summer and winter of 1811, after the Kingdom of Etruria had been annexed by the French Empire, Denon took artworks from dissolved churches and convents in Genoa, Massa, Carrara, Pisa, Volterra, and Florence. In Arezzo, Denon took The Annunciation of the Virgin, by Giorgio Vasari, from the Church of Santa Maria Novella d'Arezzo. His choice of these "primitive" Italian artworks was odd for the time: the work of the "primitive", or Gothic Italian, artists of c. 1180–1400 was widely disliked.

In Florence, Denon searched the convent of Saint Catherine, the churches of Santa Maria Maddalena dei Pazzi and Santo Spirito, and the Accademia di Belle Arti di Firenze, and sent back works to the Louvre, such as Fra Filippo Lippi's Barbadori Altarpiece from Santo Spirito, Cimabue's Maestà, and Michelangelo's unfinished sculptures for the tomb of Pope Julius II were sent to the Louvre..

==== Naples ====
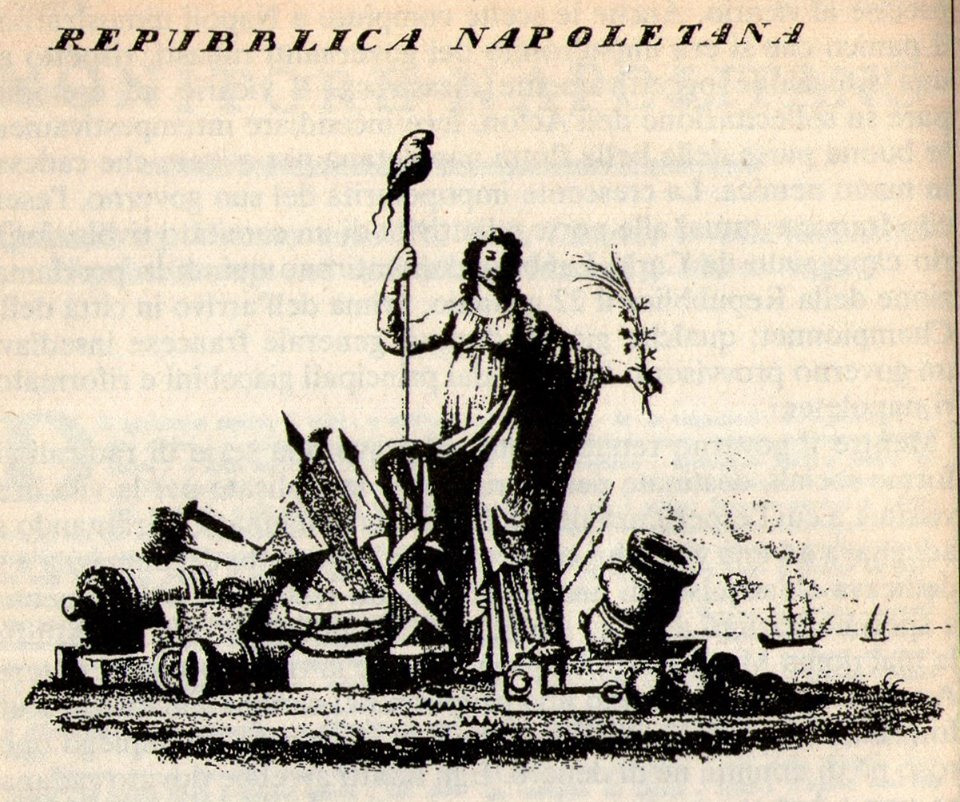
Allegory of the Repubblica Napoletana created by France as a sister republic

In January 1799 and after the occupation of Naples, General Jean-Étienne Championnet began seizing and shipping artwork in the Kingdom of Naples. In a missive he sent on February 25, he said:

I announce to you with pleasure that we have found the riches we had thought lost. In addition to the Gessi of Ercolano that are at Portici, there are two equestrian statues of Nonius, father and son, in marble for you; the Venus Callipyge will not go alone to Paris, because we have found in the porcelain manufactory, the superb Agrippina that awaits death; the life-size marble statues of Caligula, of Marcus Aurelius, and a beautiful Mercury in bronze and ancient marble busts of great merit, among which one of Homer. The convoy will leave in a few days.

Paintings, sculpture, books, and gold were all taken by the French during the rule of the short-lived Repubblica Napoletana. The previous year, fearing the worst, King Ferdinand I of the Two Sicilies had transferred 14 masterpieces to Palermo, but the French soldiers plundered many works from nearby collections like the Gallerie di Capodimonte and the Palace of Capodimonte.

==== The catalog of Canova ====
As a papal diplomat, sculptor Antonio Canova made a list of Italian paintings that were sent to France. Below is the list, as reported by French sources, which also notes how many works were subsequently repatriated or lost. Canova was primarily concerned with figurative works and sculptures, omitting minor or merely decorative artworks.

Place of origin and time of taking	Works taken	Works returned in 1815	Works left in France	Works lost
Milan, May 1796	19	6	11	2
Cremona, June 1796	6	2	4	
Modena, June 1796	20	10	10	
Parma, June 1796	15	12	3	
Bologna, July 1796	31	15	16	
Cento, July 1796	1	0	1	
Modena, October 1796	30	11	19	
Loreto, February 1797	3	1	2	
Perugia, February 1797	3	1	2	
Mantova, February 1797	4	0	4	
Foligno, February 1797	1	1	0	
Pesaro, 1797	7	3	4	
Fano, 1797	3	0	3	
Rome, 1797	13	12	1	
Verona, May 1797	14	7	7	
Venice, September 1797	18	14	4	
Total 1796–1797	227	110	115	2
Rome, 1798	14	0	14	
Turin, 1799	66	46	20	
Florence, 1799	63	56	0	7
Turin, 1801	3	0	3	
Naples, 1802	7	0	7	
Rome (San Luigi dei Francesi)	26	0	26	
Parma, 1803	27	14	13	
Total 1798–1803	206	116	83	7
Savona, 1811	6	3	3	
Genoa, 1811	9	6	3	
Chiavari, 1811	2	1	1	
Levanto, 1811	1	1	0	
La Sapienza, 1811	1	1	0	
Pisa, 1811	9	1	8	
Florence, 1811	9	0	9	
Parma, 1811	5	2	3	
Foligno, 1811	1	1	0	
Todi, 1811	3	2	1	
Perugia, 1811	10	5	5	
Milan (Brera), 1812	5	0	5	
Florence, 1813	12	0	12	
Total 1811–1813	73	23	50	
Overall total	506	249	248	9

=== Victory celebrations of 1798 ===
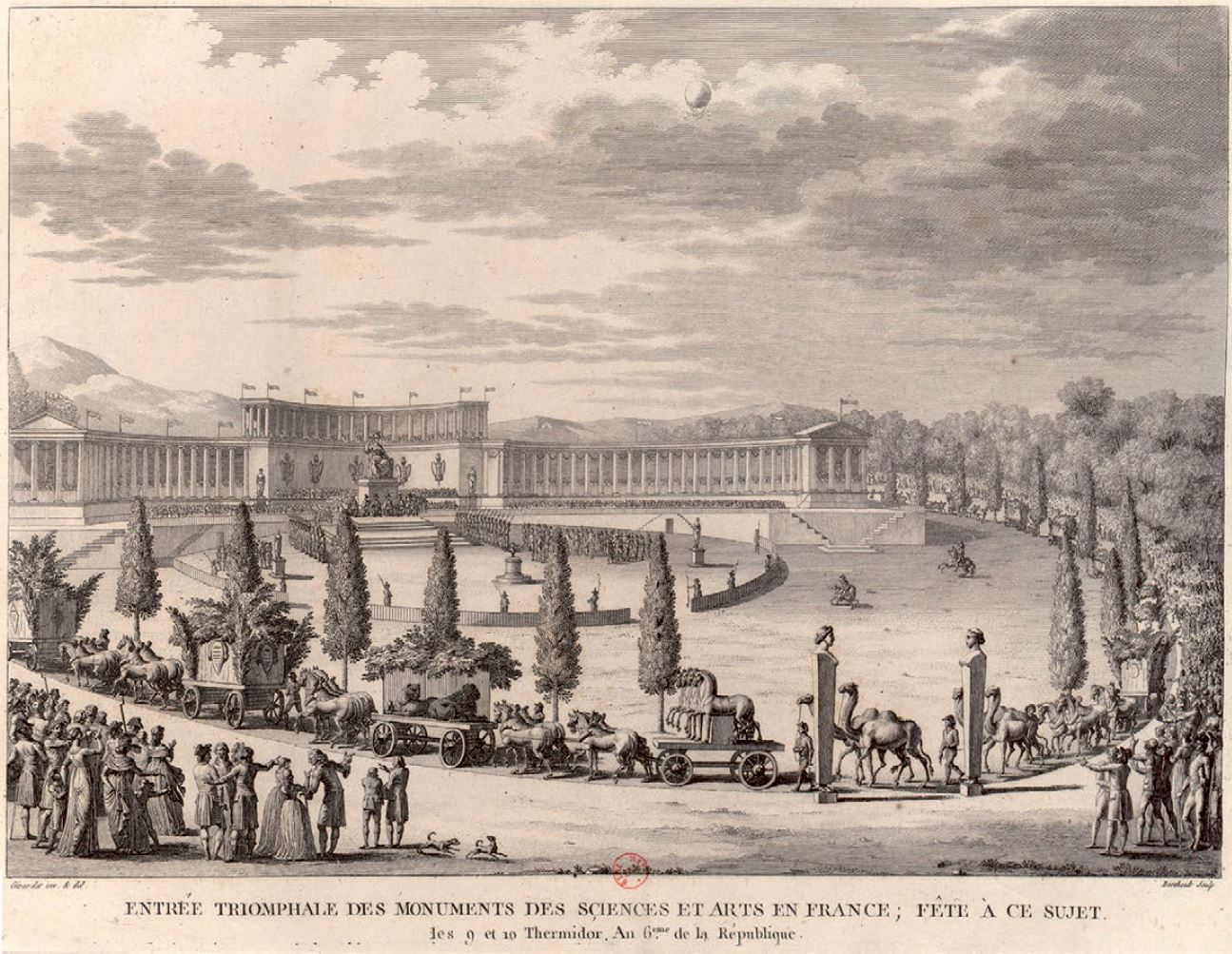
Carts of artwork stolen by Napoleon arriving at the Paris Champ de Mars, in front of the École militaire, after the first Italian campaign on July 27 and 28, 1798

On 27 and 28 July 1798, there was a grand celebration of French military victories, which coincided with the arrival in Paris of a third convoy carrying artworks from Rome and Venice. The triumphal parade was planned months ahead of time. As seen in commemorative prints, its motto was, La Grèce les ceda; Rome les a perdus; leur sort changea deux fois, il ne changera plus (Greece has fallen; Rome is lost; their luck changed twice, it won't change again).

The procession contained the Horses of Saint Mark, the Apollo Belvedere, the Venus de' Medici, the Discobolus, the Laocoön group, and sixty other works, among which were nine Raphaels, two Correggios, collections of antiques and minerals, exotic animals, and Vatican manuscripts. Popular attention was also drawn to the exotic animals and the Black Madonna of the Basilica della Santa Casa, believed to be the work of Saint Luke.

=== Egypt and Syria ===
After Italy, the French Army began its campaign in Ottoman Egypt and Ottoman Syria (both under rule by the Ottoman Empire at the time). The army brought a contingent of 167 scholars with it, including Denon, Monge, and mathematician Joseph Fourier. Their scientific expedition undertook excavations and scientific studies to study Egypt's pyramids, temples, and Pharaonic statues, like the tomb of Amenhotep III. Looting from the area was not considered a violation of international norms by Europeans, due to the influence of orientalism and European countries' tense relations with the Ottoman Empire. Most of objects taken by the French Army were lost to the British, including the sarcophagus of Nectanebo II and the Rosetta Stone, after the Battle of the Nile in 1798, and were sent to the British Museum instead. The French scholars' studies culminated in the Mémoires sur l'Égypte and the monumental Description de l'Égypte encyclopedia, which was finished in 1822.

=== Central Europe ===
Following the Treaty of Lunéville between France and the Holy Roman Empire in 1801, manuscripts, codices, and paintings began to flow from northern and central Europe into Paris. In Bavaria, the works were selected by a Parisian professor, Neveu. Neveu delivered a list of the confiscated artworks to the Bavarian government, which later allowed them to make requisition requests. However, the Holy Roman Empire's imperial collections remained mostly untouched.

With the Peace of Pressburg in December 1805 and the Battle of Jena–Auerstedt shortly after, Denon and his aides Count Daru and Stendhal began to systematically appropriate art from regions of the Holy Roman Empire, Westphalia, and Prussia. With Berlin, Charlottenburg, and Sanssouci combed through, Denon went on to relieve the gallery of Cassel of 48 paintings. En route, the paintings were directed to Mainz, where the Empress Joséphine saw them and convinced Napoleon to have them sent to Malmaison as a gift to her. In the end, Denon selected over 299 paintings to take from the Cassel collection. Additionally, nearly 78 paintings were taken from the Duke of Brunswick, and Stendhall collected over 500 illuminated manuscripts and the famous art collection of the deceased Cardinal Mazarin.

In all, over a thousand paintings were taken from German and Austrian cities, including Berlin, Vienna, Nuremberg, and Potsdam—400 art objects came from Vienna alone. As in Italy, many works were melted down for easy transport and sale, and two large auctions were held in 1804 and 1811 to fund further French military expeditions.

=== Spain ===
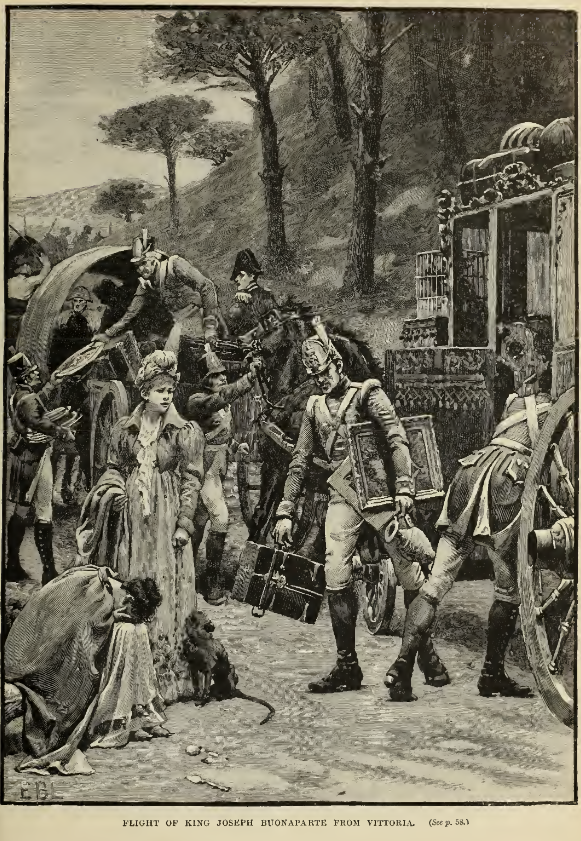
Flight of King Joseph Bonaparte from Vittoria, 1865

During and after the Peninsular War, hundreds of artworks were seized from Spain, continuing until the first abdication of Napoleon in 1814. Denon again selected works, including some by Bartolomé Esteban Murillo, Francisco de Zurbarán, and Diego Velázquez, to send to Paris for display.

With Joseph Bonaparte enthroned in Spain, most of the works came from the Spanish royal collection and were stored at the Prado in Madrid, although the Spanish administration was able to delay their shipment until 1813. From El Escorial palace, General Horace Sébastiani and Marshal Jean-de-Dieu Soult claimed many Spanish paintings, particularly Murillos, while General Jean Barthélemy Darmagnac claimed mostly Dutch works from the collection. Soult took so many Spanish paintings for himself that his collection eventually made up a significant portion of the Louvre's "Spanish gallery" after his death.

In 1812, French control of Spain began to collapse following the Battle of Salamanca. King Joseph tried to flee, and his first attempt at flight included an enormous baggage train of looted objects from the Spanish royal collection. After the Battle of Vitoria in 1813, Joseph abandoned the artworks and fled with his army. British troops captured almost 250 of the abandoned paintings, and held a public auction to disperse some of the captured art. The Duke of Wellington himself sent around 165 to England. The Duke apparently offered to return the paintings to King Ferdinand VII after the wars. Ferdinand declined the offer and in gratitude allowed the Duke keep the paintings, most of which are now on display at Apsley House.

=== Restitutions ===
==== Initial negotiations ====
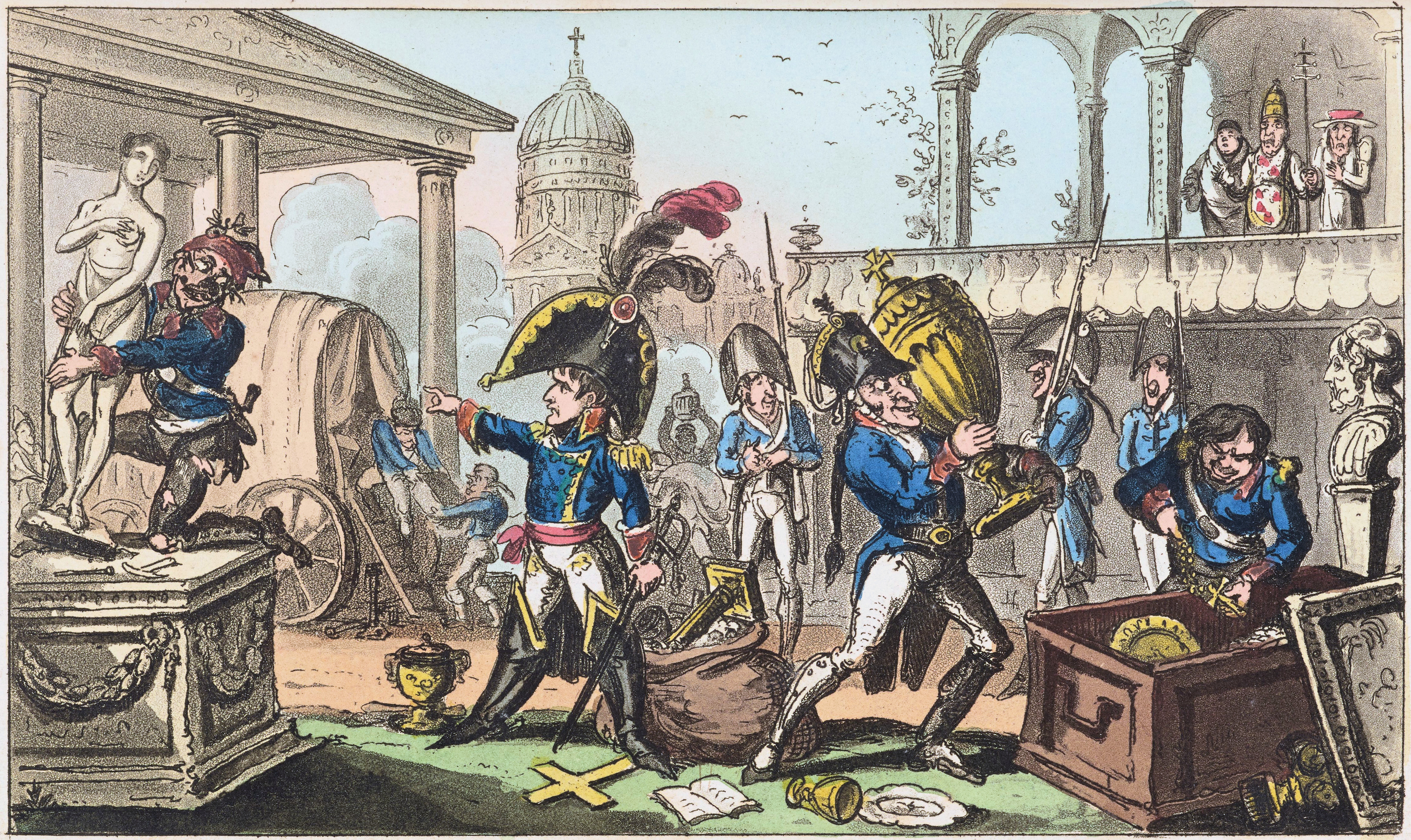
1815 George Cruikshank cartoon showing Napoleon's troops looting in Rome

During the First Restoration of the Bourbon dynasty in France under Louis XVIII (1814–15), the nations of the Sixth Coalition did not initially stipulate the return of artworks from France. They were to be treated as "inalienable property of the Crown." On 8 May 1814, however, Louis declared that works not yet hung in French museums would be returned, which led to the return of many of the Spanish works. Manuscripts were returned to Austria and Prussia by the end of 1814, and Prussia recovered all its statues, as well as 10 paintings by Lucas Cranach, and 3 by Antonio da Correggio. The Duke of Brunswick recovered 85 paintings, 174 Limoges porcelains, and 980 majolica vases. However most of the works remained in France.

After Napoleon's second abdication in June 1815, followed by another restoration of Louis XVIII, the return of art became a part of negotiations, although the lack of historical precedent made it a messy affair.

Some nations did not wait for agreements from the Congress of Vienna, in order to act. In July 1815, the Prussians began to force restitutions. King Frederick William III of Prussia ordered diplomat von Ribbentropp, art expert Jacobi, and reserve officer Eberhardt de Groote to deal with the returns. On 8 July, they demanded Denon return all the Prussian treasures; but he refused, claiming that the returns weren't authorised by Louis XVIII. Von Ribbentropp then threatened to have Prussian soldiers seize the works and imprison and extradite Denon to Prussia. By 13 July, all the key Prussian works were out of the Louvre and packed up for travel.

When the Dutch consul arrived at the Louvre to make similar requests, Denon denied him access and wrote to Charles Maurice de Talleyrand-Périgord and the Congress of Vienna:

If we give up all the requests of the Netherlands and Belgium, we deny to the museum one of the most important assets, the Flemings ... Russia is not against, Austria has just received everything, and practically also Prussia. There is only England, that has nothing to ask from the museum, but that has since stolen the Elgin Marbles from the Parthenon, and now thinks to make competition with the Louvre, and wishes to loot this museum to collect the crumbs.

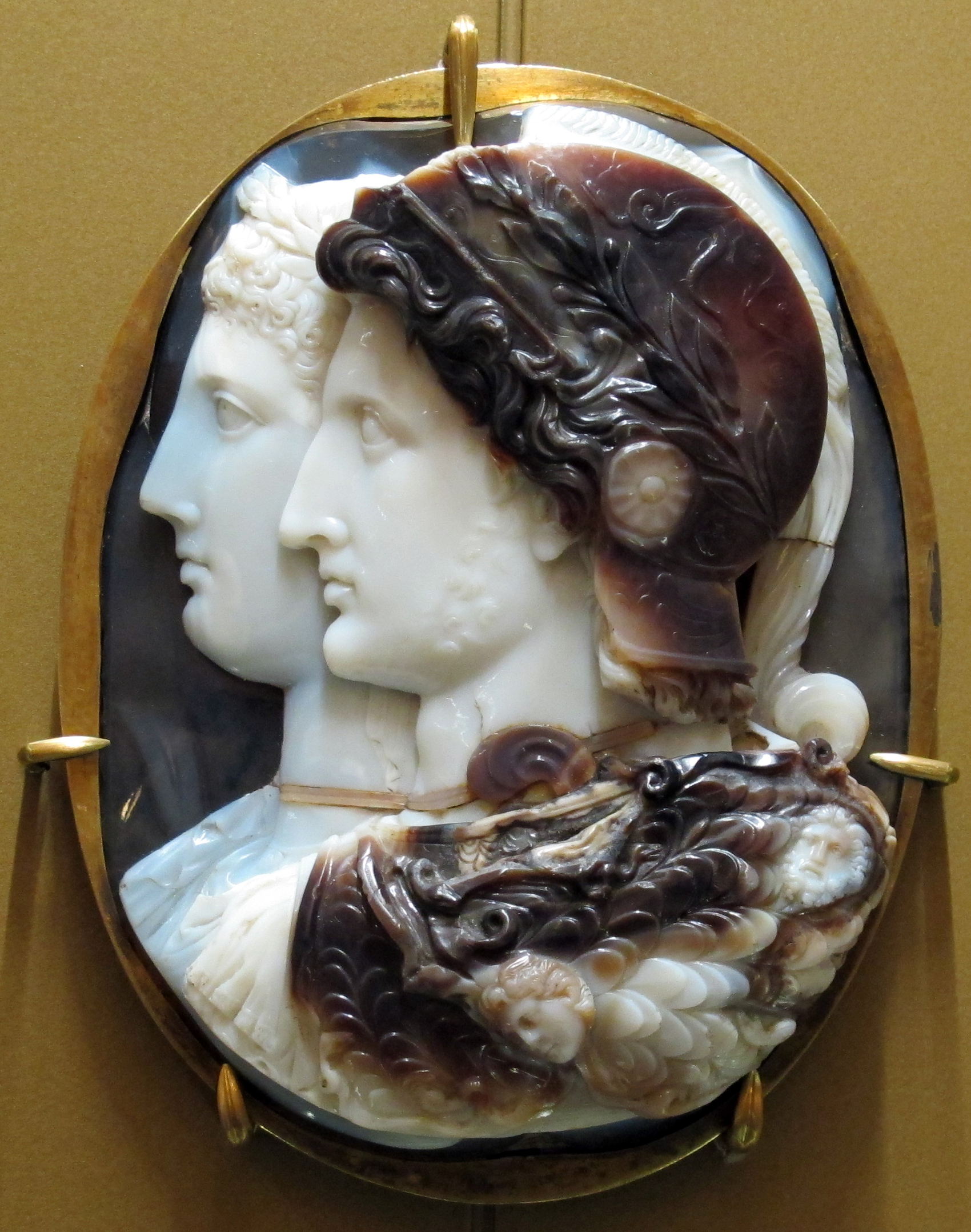
The Gonzaga Cameo, depicting Ptolemy II and Arsinoe II, now in the Hermitage Museum

French museum officials tried to hold onto any objects they had seized, arguing that keeping the artworks in France was a gesture of generosity towards their countries of origin and a tribute to their cultural or scientific importance. In 1815, for example, the French National Museum of Natural History refused the return of artifacts to the Netherlands, claiming that such would necessarily break up the museum's complete collections. The natural historians offered to select and send an "equivalent" collection instead. In the end, with the aid of the Prussians, the delegates from the Low Countries grew so impatient that they took their works back by force.

On 20 September 1815, Austria, the United Kingdom, and Prussia agreed that the remaining artworks should be returned, and affirmed that there was no principle of conquest that would permit France to retain its spoils. Exceptionally, Napoleon's Egyptian spoils which had been ceded to the UK a few years earlier were not part of the negotiations. Russian Emperor Alexander I of Russia was not part of this agreement, and preferred to compromise with the French government, having just acquired for the Hermitage Museum 38 artworks sold by descendants of Joséphine de Beauharnais to discharge her debts. The tsar had also received a gift from her shortly before her death in 1814—the Gonzaga Cameo from the Vatican. After the Vienna agreement was completed, the occupying forces of Paris continued to remove and send artworks to Spain, the Netherlands, Belgium, Austria, and some Italian cities.

French representatives protested the returns and argued that they were illegal, as they lacked the force of treaty. Writing about a shipment of paintings to Milan, Stendhal said, "The allies took 150 paintings. I hope to be authorised to observe that we have taken them through the Treaty of Tolentino. The allies took our paintings without a treaty." On the repatriation of Giulio Romano's The Stoning of Saint Stephen to Genoa, Denon maintained that the work "was offered as tribute to the French government from the city council of Genoa" and that transportation would endanger the work, due to its fragility.

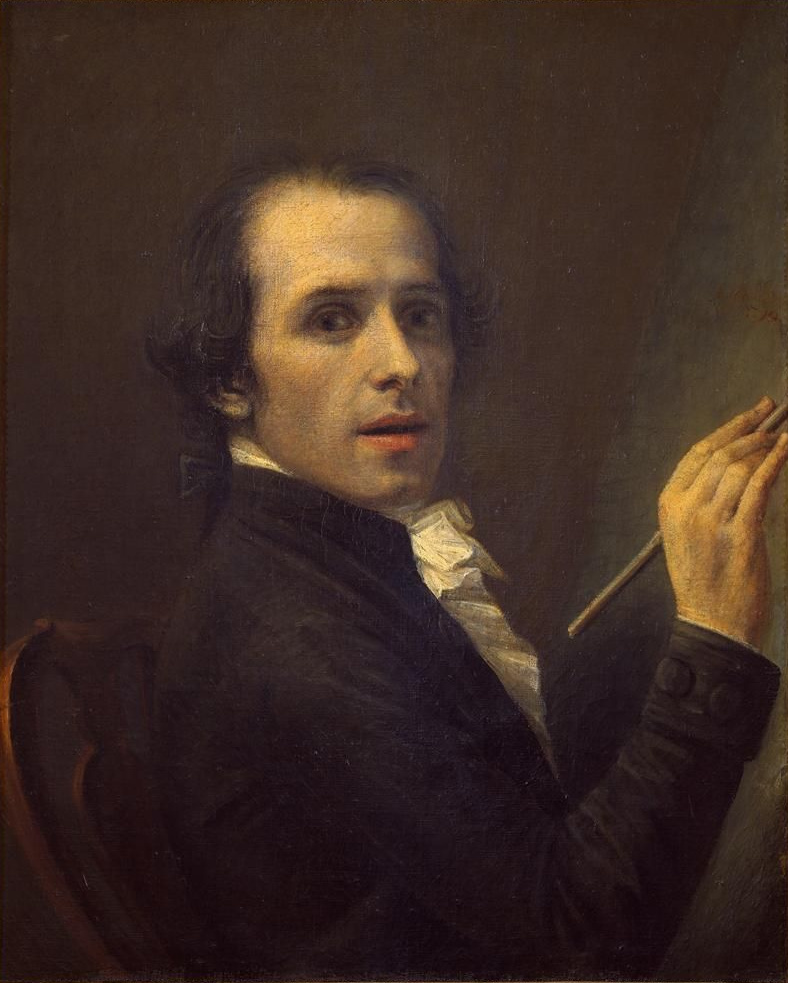
Self-portrait of Antonio Canova, c. 1792

In comparison to the other nations, the Italian cities were disorganised and without the support of a national army or diplomatic corps to make official requests. Antonio Canova was sent by the Vatican on a diplomatic mission to the peace conference for the second Treaty of Paris in August 1815. Canova sent letters asking Wilhelm von Humboldt and Lord Castlereagh to support the return of Italian artworks and annul the conditions of the Treaty of Tolentino. In September, Canova also met with Louis XVIII, and that audience lessened French resistance to the repatriations. By October, Austria, Prussia, and Britain had agreed to support Canova's efforts, which led to the return of many statues and other sculptures. The Vatican manuscripts were restored by Marino Marini, the nephew of a Vatican librarian, as well as lead type that had been seized from the Congregation for the Evangelisation of Peoples.

British public opinion was generally against the French, and the Duke of Wellington wrote to Lord Castlereagh to intervene on behalf of the Low Countries. Not satisfied, he sent his troops to join the Prussians in the Louvre to remove the Flemish and Dutch paintings from the walls. As the Courier described it in October 1815:

The Duke of Wellington came to the diplomatic conferences with a note in his hand, by which he expressly required all works of Art should be restored to their respective owners. This excited great attention, and the Belgians, who have immense claims to make, had been hitherto obstinately refused, did not wait to be told that they could begin to take back what was theirs. ... The brave Belgians are even now on the way to returning their Potters and their Rubens.

==== Treaty agreements and shipments ====
The conditions of the 1815 Treaty of Paris, signed in November required that any artworks to be returned had to be properly identified and returned to the nations they originated from. These conditions made it difficult to determine where some of the paintings should be sent. For example, some Flemish paintings were mistakenly returned to the Netherlands, rather than Belgium. The treaty also required effort on the part of the conquered nations for their art to be returned. The situation was only partially resolved when the British offered to finance the costs of repatriating some artworks to Italy, with the offer of 200,000 lire to Pope Pius VII.

For various reasons, including lack of money, knowledge of the theft, or appreciation for the value of the works taken, the restored allied governments did not always pursue the return of the appropriated paintings. The Austrian governor of Lombardy did not request the Lombardic artworks taken from churches, such as The Crowning with Thorns by Titian. Ferdinand VII of Spain refused the return of several old master paintings when they were offered by the Duke of Wellington. They were taken to London instead. The Tuscan government, under the Hapsburg-Lorraines, did not request works such as the Saint Francis Receiving the Stigmata by Giotto, Maestà by Cimabue, or the Coronation of the Virgin by Fra Angelico. The ceiling paintings of the ducal palace in Venice were never requested, although Titian's Martyrdom of Saint Peter was. Canova never asked for 23 paintings dispersed throughout the French provincial museums, as a gesture of good will.

The Horses of Saint Mark were returned to Venice (not Constantinople, from where they were originally taken by the Venetians) in 1815, after it took workers over a week to remove them from the Arc de Triomphe du Carrousel; the streets around the Arc were blocked by Austrian dragoons to prevent any interference with the removal. The Lion of Saint Mark was dropped and broke while it was being removed from the Esplanade des Invalides before being returned to its original piazza.

On 24 October 1815, during negotiations of the treaty, a convoy of 41 carriages was organised that, escorted by Prussian soldiers, traveled to Milan. From there, the artworks were distributed to their legitimate owners throughout Europe. In November, French general Athenase Lavallée reported that Spain had received 248 paintings, Austria 325, and Prussia 258 bronzes.

== Legacy ==
Between 1814 and 1815, the Musée Napoleon (the Louvre's name at the time) was dissolved. From its opening in 1793, artists and scholars had flocked to the museum to see its expansive, exhaustive collections, including Charles Lock Eastlake, Henry Fuseli, Benjamin West, Maria Cosway, and J. M. W. Turner. One English artist, Thomas Lawrence, expressed sorrow at its dissolution, despite the injustices that had led to its creation. Still, the museum's impact remained:

The great museum of Napoleon did not end with the dispersion of its materials and masterpieces. Its example outlived him, contributing decisively to the formation of all the European museums. The Louvre, the national museum of France, had shown for the first time that the artworks of the past, even if collected by princes, belonged in relation to their people. And this principle (with the exception of the British royal collection) inspired the great public museums of the 1800s.

— Paul Wescher

Wescher also pointed out that, "[The return of the looted artworks] contributed to the creation [of an] awareness of national artistic heritages, an awareness that did not exist in the 1700s." The circulation of artworks during the Napoleonic era had actually increased the renown of artists that were otherwise unknown internationally. Similarly, aristocrats like Charles-François Lebrun created vast private collections by buying up or requisitioning artworks that had been put into circulation by the French armies.

After 1815, European museums were no longer just a hoard of artifacts but had become an expression of political and cultural power. The Prado in Madrid, the Rijksmuseum in Amsterdam, and the National Gallery in London were all founded following the Louvre's example. The conditions of the 1815 Treaty of Paris set a nationalist precedent for future repatriations in Europe, such as that of Nazi plunder in the 20th century.

The repatriations took a long time and were incomplete; almost half of the looted works of art remained in France. As a condition for the return of the artworks, many of the works were required to be shown in a public gallery and were not necessarily returned to their original locations. For example, Perugino's Decemviri Altarpiece was not reinstalled in its chapel in Perugia until October 2019, and remains incomplete. The long time it has taken to return some appropriated works in turn has become an argument against their restitution, particularly with museums' adoption of "retention policies" in the 19th century.

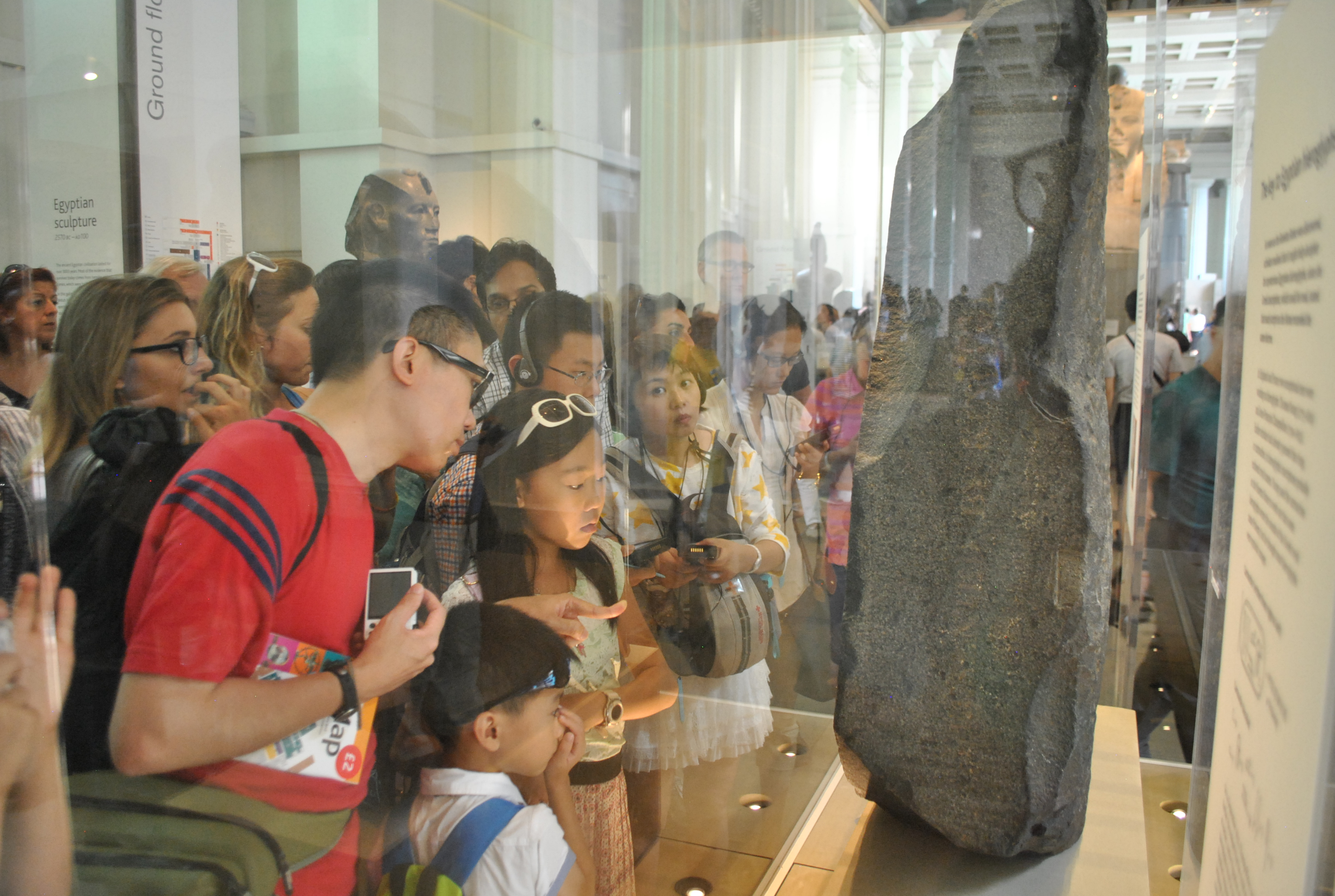
Tourists viewing the Rosetta Stone in the British Museum

Attempts at reacquisition have continued, however, up to and including the present day. During the Franco-Prussian War, Prussia asked France to return works of art still held from the time of the looting but never repatriated. Vincenzo Peruggia described his 1911 theft of the Mona Lisa as an attempt to restore the painting to Italy, claiming incorrectly that the painting had been stolen by Napoleon.

In 1994, the then-general director of the Italian Ministry of Culture, Francesco Sisinni believed the conditions were right for the return of The Wedding at Cana of Veronese. In 2010, historian and Veneto official Estore Beggiatto wrote a letter to French presidential spouse Carla Bruni, urging the painting's return; the painting is still at the Louvre.

Egypt has requested the repatriation of the Rosetta Stone, which was discovered by French soldiers in 1799 during their campaign in Egypt, then captured by British forces two years later; it was then brought to the British Museum, where it remains. Additionally, Zahi Hawass, then the Antiquities Minister of Egypt, launched a campaign in 2019 to have the Dendera zodiac returned to Egypt. It had been removed in 1822 from the Dendera Temple complex by Sébastien Louis Saulnier after being identified by Vivant Denon in 1799, and is on display in the Louvre.

== Artworks taken ==
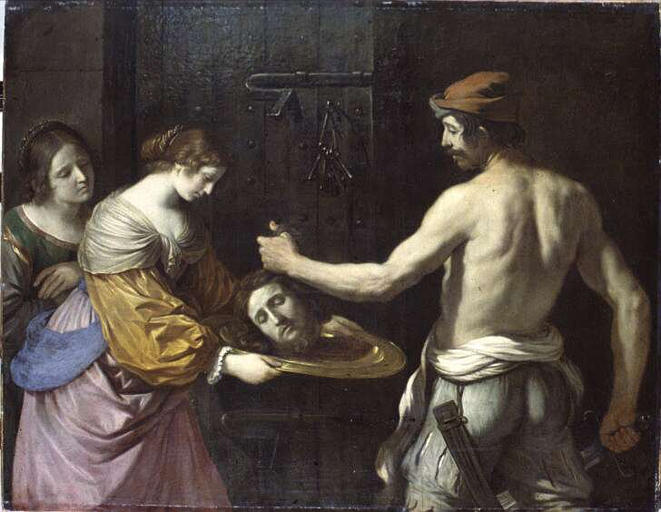
Salome Receiving The Head of Saint John, Guercino

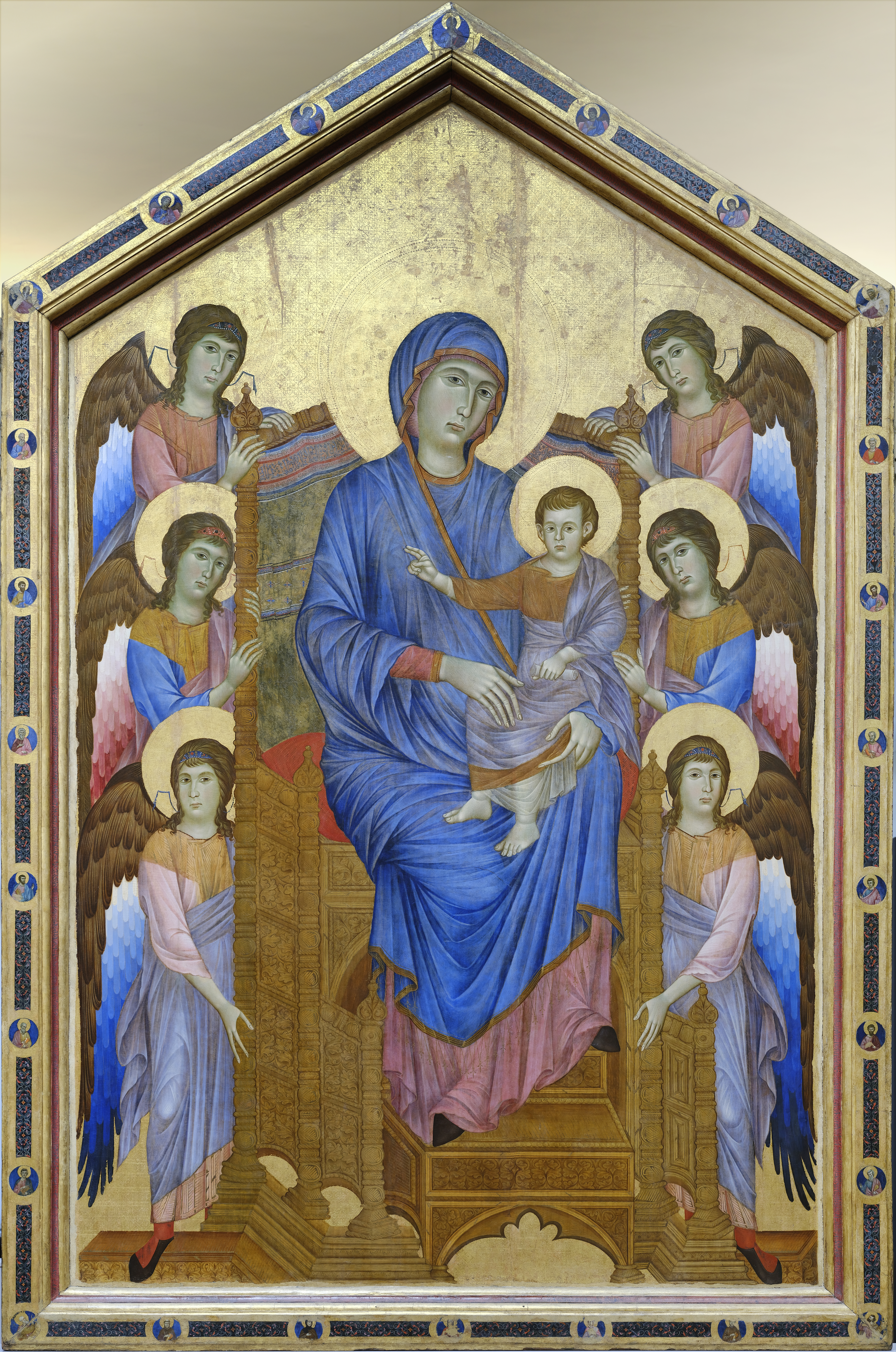
Maestà, Cimabue, c. 1280, Louvre

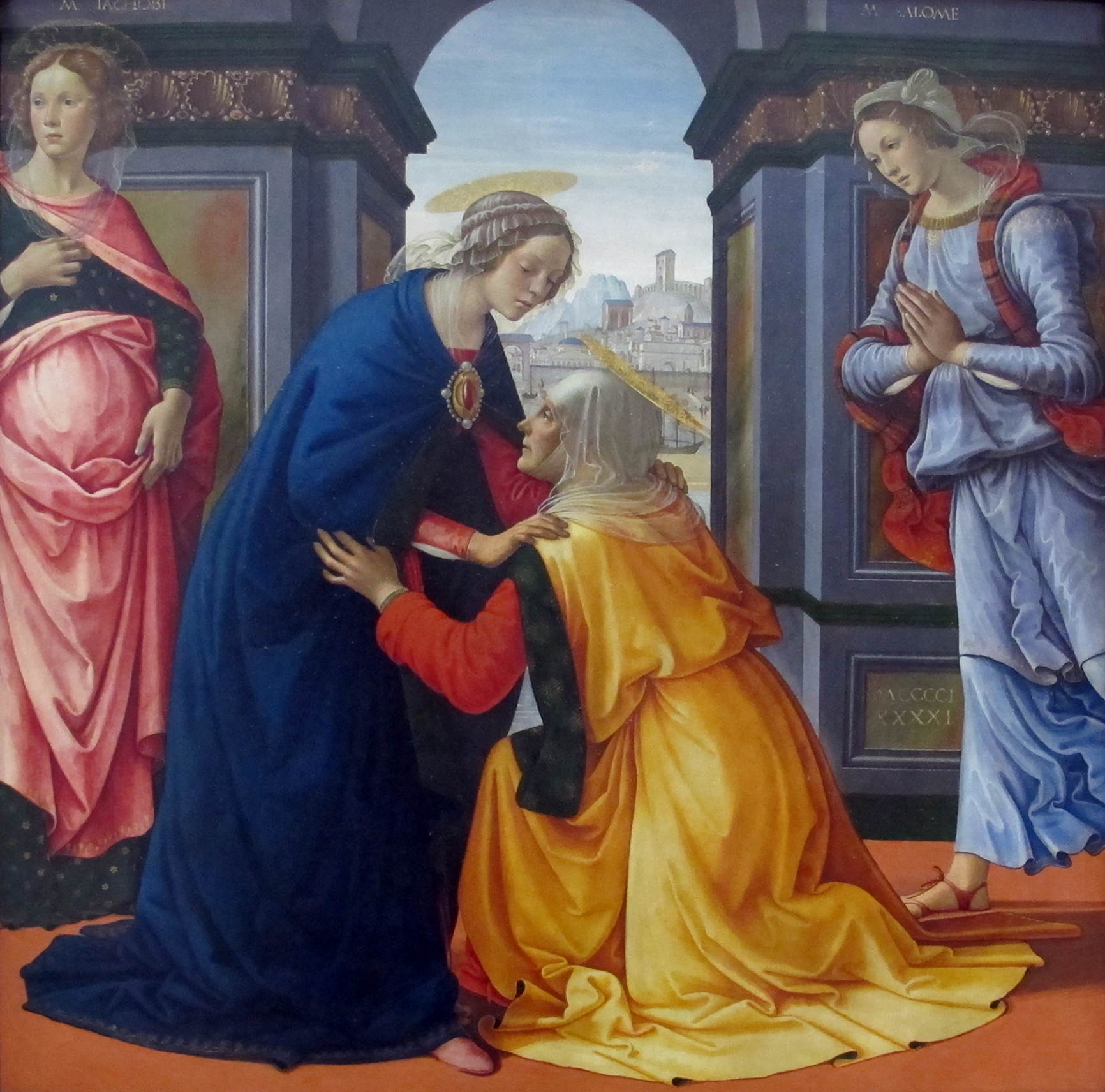
The Visitation, Domenico Ghirlandaio

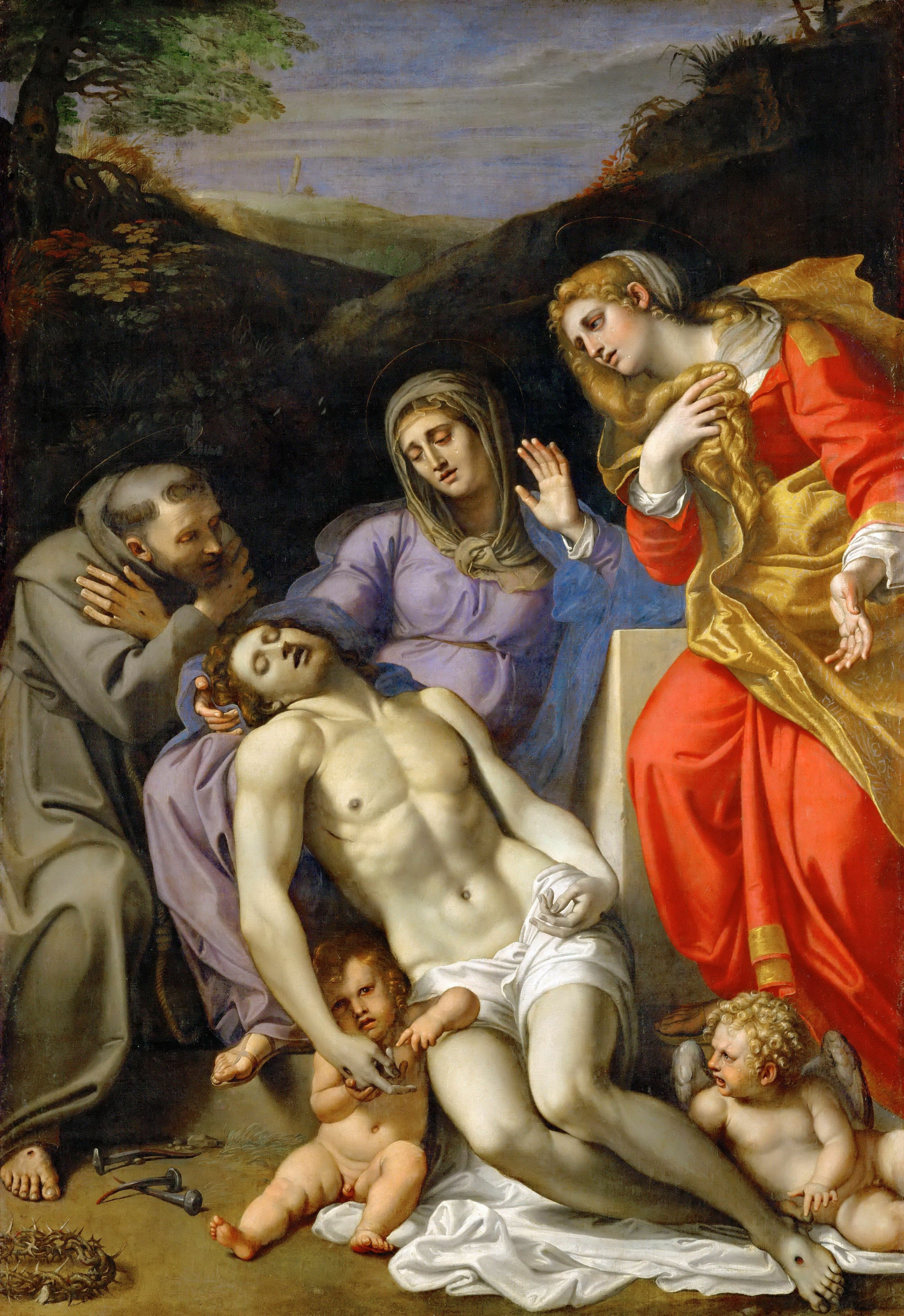
Pietà with Saint Francis and Saint Mary Magdalene, Annibale Carracci

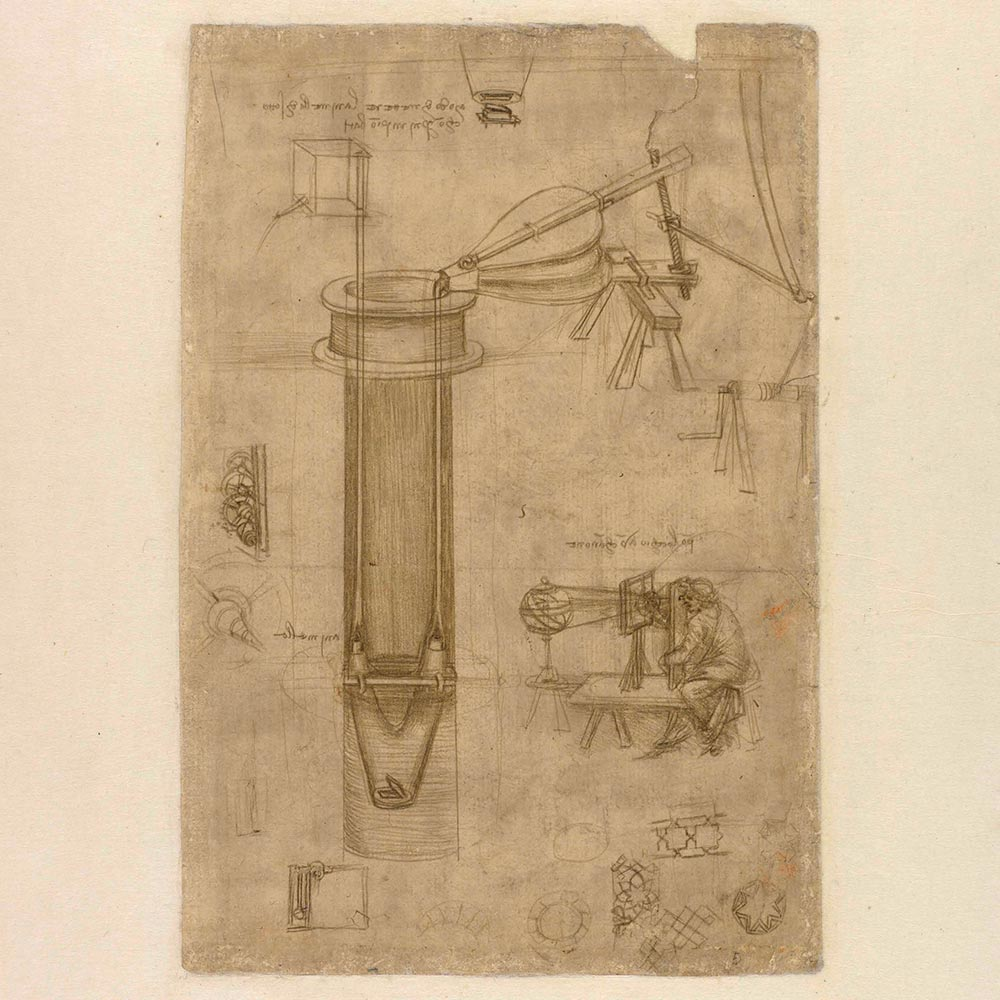
Diagram from da Vinci's Codex Atlanticus

== See also ==
- List of artworks with contested provenance
- Looted art
- Repatriation (cultural property)
- Economic and logistical aspects of the Napoleonic Wars
