= Master of Città di Castello =

Italian painter

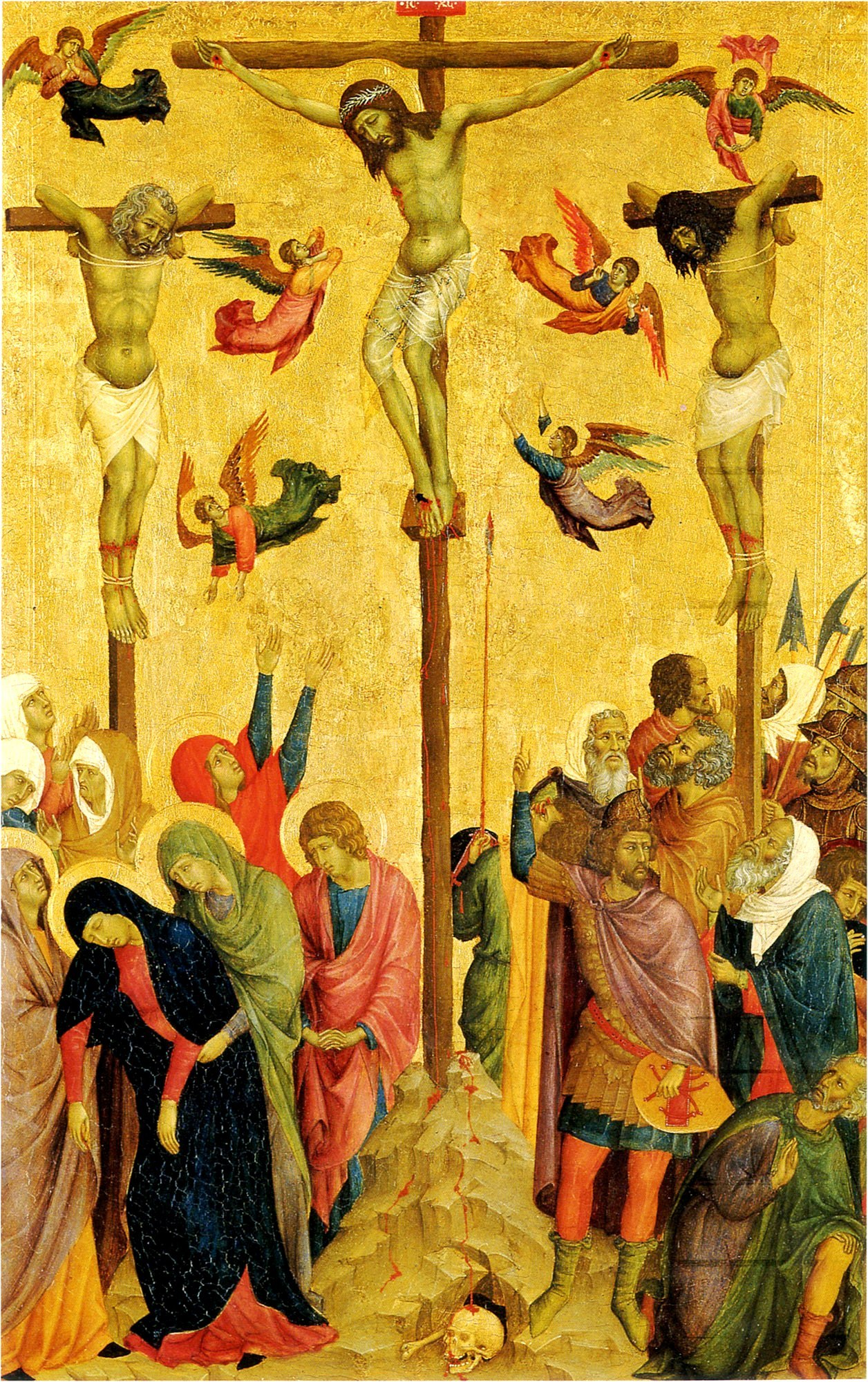
The Crucifixion by Master of Città di Castello, c. 1320

Master of Città di Castello, in Italian, Maestro di Città di Castello (active 1290–1320), was an anonymous painter of Medieval art. Mason Perkins is responsible for his identification and naming in 1908, based on the styling from the Master preserved at the Pinacoteca comunale, Città di Castello, in Umbria.

== Attributions and influences ==
The single point of chronological anchor of the Master's activity is related to recognition on the back of Polyptych Montespecchio, indicating that it was made on the occasion of the inauguration in 1307 of the new church of the Hermitage of Montespeccio. All other dating criteria are based solely on stylistic studies, including the presence of influences from Duccio and Giotto. Specifically called the Master by Duccio in 1302, served as a model for the Master of Città di Castello and some works as denoting the influence of young Simone Martini, it is assumed for them a later dating to 1315-1320. Most historians are therefore place his time between the last decade of the thirteenth century and the second decade of the fourteenth century, except Freuler who dates his early works around 1285 and the last around 1330.

The Master's training took place in the very complex time of the Sienese cultural background between 1270-1290, during years of extraordinary upheaval of Western pictorial language crossroads of Byzantine Empire pictorial stereotype centuries already fundamentally rethought by the innovations of the great masters of the moment (the first and foremost being the painter Cimabue certainly the most influential in 1280, but it should also be mentioned among his fellow Sienese artists Guido of Siena and Dietisalvi di Speme and the revolutionary new pictorial language that was emerging on the sites of Assisi embodied by the young Giotto and Duccio. In this context, the Master of Città di Castello is clearly on the side of "modern", and indeed was one of the early followers of Duccio, of those so-called "first generation", including Master of Badia a Isola and Master of Albertini.

Regarding the latter, the work of the Master of Città di Castello shows such stylistic affinities with his work, and even a punch shaped flower with five petals which was used for the Virgin and Child by the Master of Albertini shows up in the Polyptych of the Montespecchio, and some critics (Labriola, Freuler) felt that it was a single artist. Bagnoli however revealed many differences in their work (lighting scenes, volume rendering, brushwork). It is now thought that this could be of two brothers (like Ambrogio Lorenzetti and Pietro Lorenzetti), or two artists working in the same shop.

== Style ==
For Chelazzi Dini, the Master of Città di Castello's work is that of an artist with "a strong personality and remarkable color sensitivity, and therefore easily identifiable amidst the abundant production inspired by Duccio". Freuler in turn refers to "emotional eccentricity of his figures but also [...] personal colors, expressive". This is indeed a full lyric, dramatic, driven by mankind expressions, lively narrative, and made so terribly effective by technical mastery, for innovations Duccio (finesse, elegance, harmony chromatic), Giotto (naturalism, solemnity and volume control) are treated here in an exemplary manner and natural.

Always listening to the latest news, the second decade of the thirteenth century saw a new direction for his work with the influence of the first creations of Simone Martini (which is closely related to the other heirs sensitive to this new trend as Ugolino di Nerio and Segna di Bonaventura for example), and the spatial and chromatic research reveal increasingly subtle similarities.

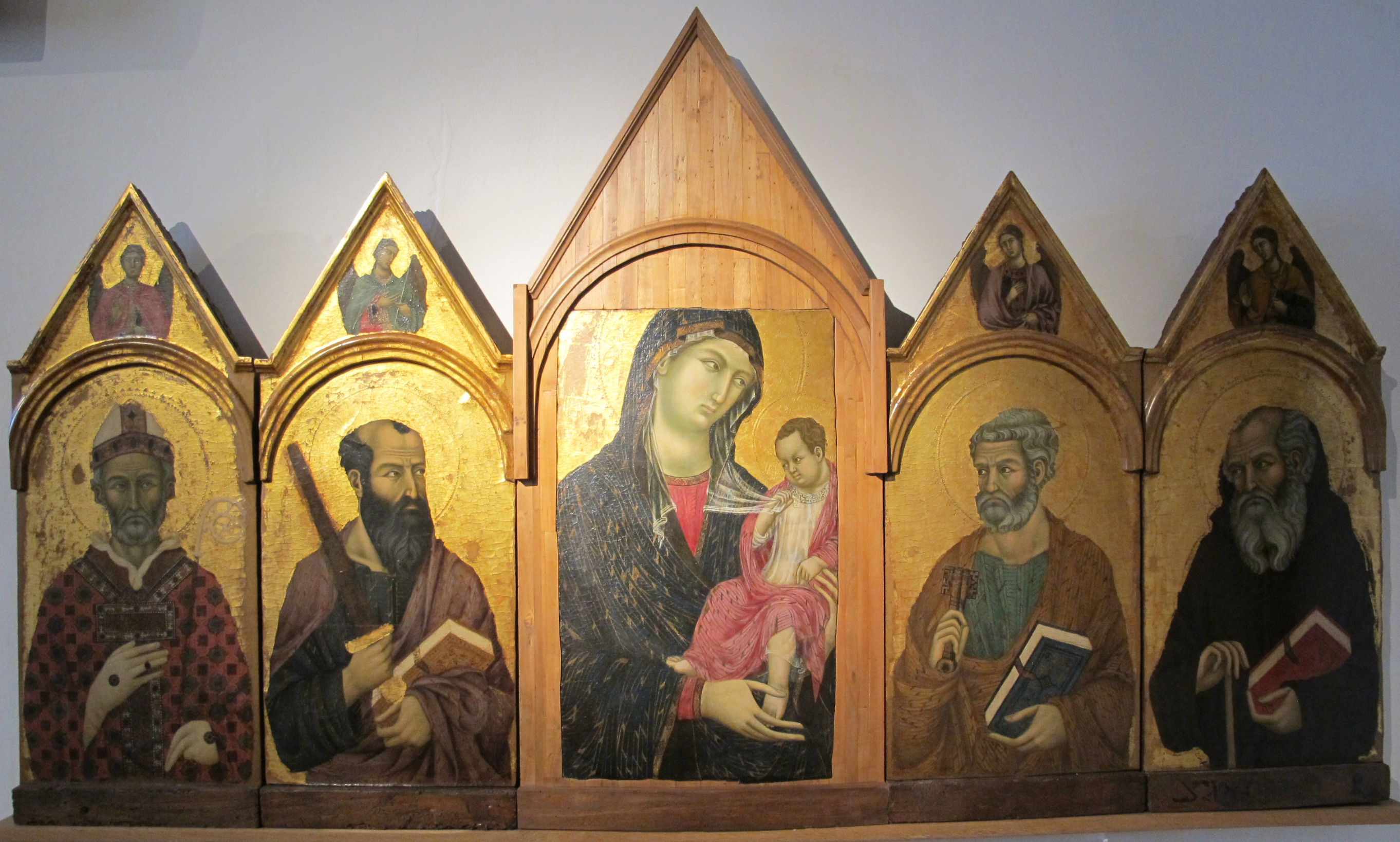
Montespecchio Polyptych 1307, exhibited in the Pinacoteca Nazionale (Siena)

== The Montespecchio Polyptych ==
The altarpiece known as the Montespecchio Polyptych was executed for the consecration of the new church Santa Maria di Monte Eremo at Montespecchio in the present-day commune of Murlo, near Siena, an event which took place on 16 April 1307, as confirmed by the presence of St. Anthony dedicatee of the place, the inclusion of the writing partially legible on the back panel of the Madonna and Child.

Dismembered (presumably in 1687), the different panels have subsequently undergone numerous changes. The panel of the Madonna and Child was drastically cut down to a rectangular format (and embedded within a larger panel). Long preserved in the church of Santa Cecilia Crevole (Murlo), and long attributed to Pietro Lorenzetti, it was then attributed to the Master of Città di Castello by Mason in 1908, before he arrived at the Museo dell'Opera del Duomo in Siena in 1920. The panels depicting St. Augustine, St. Paul, St. Peter, St. Anthony Abbot, were meanwhile long attributed to Duccio and listed as such by the gallery in Siena in 1894 (inv. No. 29-32), before being reassigned by Nicola 1912 to the Master of Città di Castello. Finally, it was only after a controversy among art historians that lasted throughout the twentieth century that the various panels were physically brought out together again in 2003 on the same support, the whole being now preserved in the Pinacoteca Nazionale (National Gallery) of Siena.

For installation and a living relationship with the child, the Madonna of the Montespecchio Polyptych is inspired by those of Duccio appearing on the Polyptych of Perugia and the Polyptych No. 28 of the Pinacoteca of Siena. It therefore shares many similarities with other panels themselves also inspired these works by Duccio, like the Montalcino Triptych (Montalcino, diocesan museum of religious art) Master of Maesta Cini or Master Gondi.

The work also surprised by its chromatic daring, perhaps influenced by those of its predecessors Siena (Guido di Graziano, Dietisalvi di Speme), combining red and white lacquer, purple plum and azure blue, or green and ocher.

The Montespecchio Polyptych is also famous because of its partial inscription "<M> E <F> ECIT" (Latin for "I did it") on the sword of St. Paul. The word that preceded this text probably meant the author, which makes it even more frustrating being erased. It was also assumed that he had never been written (and the name of the author is to be deduced from the one holding the sword or Paolo). Still, the "me fecit" the Montespecchio altarpiece of stands as the oldest inscription of its kind in Sienese painting. It will be followed by that of Segna di Buonaventura "SEGNA FECIT ME" on the sword of St. Paul in the polyptych No. 40 of the Siena Pinacoteca Nazionale; and that of Pietro Lorenzetti in 1320 on the sword of St. Reparata in the Tarlati Polyptych (Santa Maria della Pieve church, Arezzo): "PETRUS FECIT ME" 25.

We can also note the adoption for the first time by our anonymous master of an innovation of Duccio's: the "maphorion" (sailing virgin) painted in white. Previously (see Maesta, the central panel of the triptych of Oxford or the "Madonna of Detroit" (accessed 27 September 2013) he had kept the red "maphorion" of the Byzantine tradition.
