= Crevole Madonna =

Painting by Duccio di Buoninsegna, c. 1283

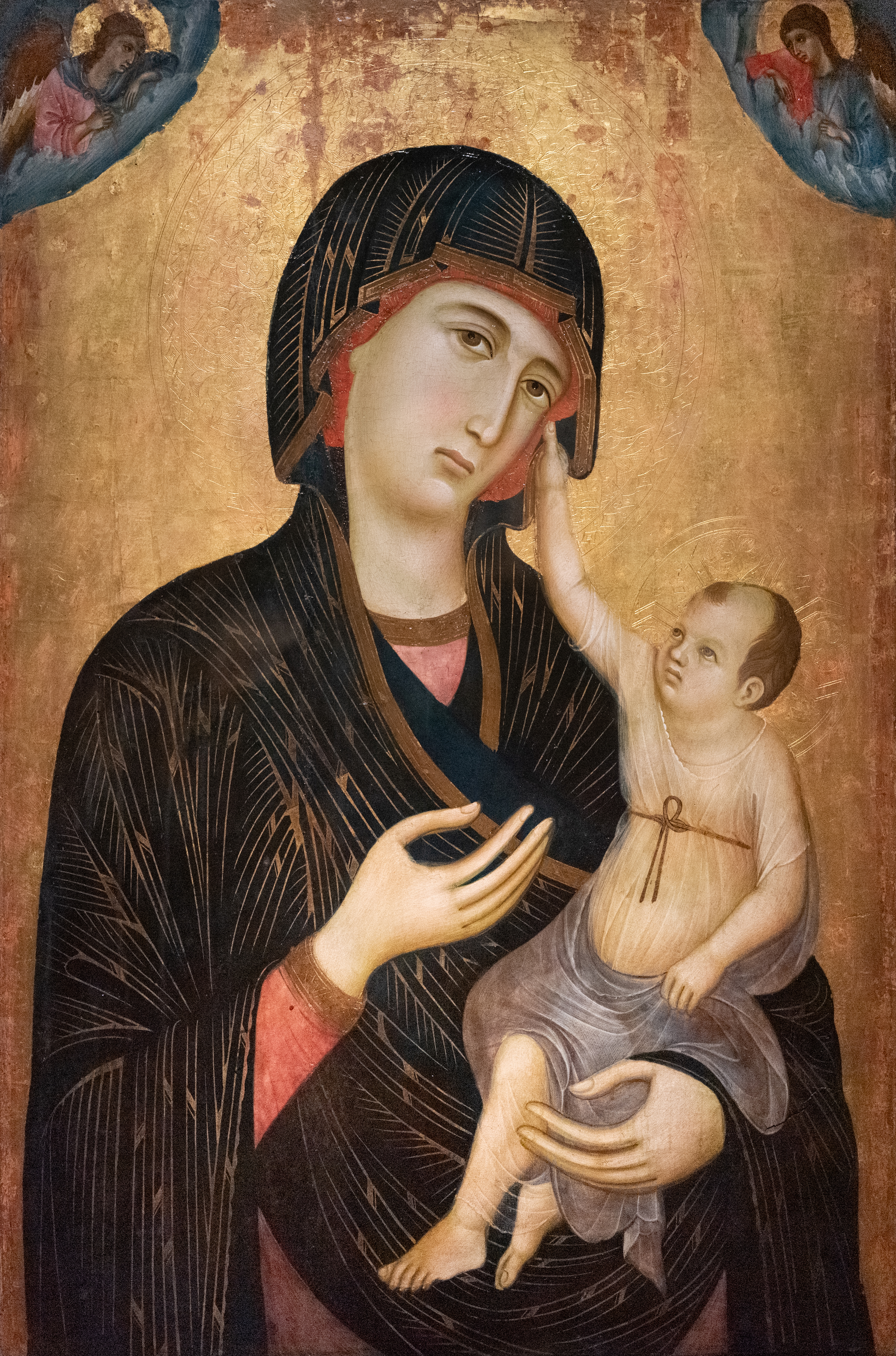
- Artist: Duccio di Buoninsegna
- Year: c. 1283–1284
- Type: Tempera and gold on wood
- Dimensions: 86 cm × 60 cm (34 in × 24 in)
- Location: Museo dell'Opera metropolitana del Duomo, Siena

The Crevole Madonna is a painting in tempera and gold on wood panel by the Tuscan painter Duccio di Buoninsegna, created c. 1283–1284. Originally located in the Pieve di Santa Cecilia in Crevole, it is now held in the Museo dell'Opera metropolitana del Duomo in Siena. It was one of the artist's first works.

== History ==
Based on his investigation, Vittorio Lusini believes that the panel was probably made for the Church of Santi Pietro e Paolo of Montepescini and then moved to the Augustinian hermitage of Montespecchio. With the suppression of the hermitage and the transfer of the monks in the 17th century, the panel was moved to the parish Church of Santa Cecilia in Crevole, which also housed the monks of Montespecchio. In recent times it was transferred to the Museo dell'Opera metropolitana del Duomo of the Siena Cathedral where it is located today. It was restored in 1929–1930. The state of conservation is more than satisfactory.

The work is not signed by the artist, nor are there written documents that help in the attribution. However, experts attribute it, without conflicting opinions, to the young Duccio.

As for the elements that led to its dating, the table does not contain any of the Gothic novelties found in the Rucellai Madonna (1285), but the face of the Madonna and Child are already characterized by a figurative sweetness and refinement that are still absent in Duccio's first works, namely the Gualino Madonna (1280–1283). The most correct dating therefore seems to be around 1283–1284.

== Description and style ==
The table depicts the Madonna with her head reclined in three quarters and a Child who stretches his right arm to tenderly touch his mother's veil. Two small angels appear in the upper corners of the table. The setting is that of the Madonna Odigitria of the Byzantine tradition, with the variant of the tender gesture of the son caressing his mother, whose sad expression is due to the premonition of the destiny of sacrifice and death of Jesus, symbolized by the apparition of angels. The panel is very similar, in general setting, to the Madonna di Castelfiorentino exhibited in the Museum of Santa Verdiana in Castelfiorentino (Florence) and attributed to Cimabue. This similarity supports the theory, also formulated on the basis of other much more solid evidence, that the young Duccio of these years was a pupil of the older Cimabue.

Beyond this similarity, the faces of the Madonna and Child are much more delicate and humanized in Duccio's table. Maria's face is more elongated and her eyes are closer to each other, but it is also the greater pictorial delicacy that makes the difference (compare the dimples above the mouth and the backs of the two noses). The face of Jesus is also softer and less angular, with a characteristic potato chip nose. The veiled transparency of his robe and the intimate gesture with his right arm towards his mother, very different from the rude fussing of Cimabue's, contribute to making his figure more delicate. These perceptible differences show the progressive detachment of Duccio's style from that of Cimabue, a detachment that appeared almost imperceptible in the previous Gualino Madonna (1280–1283) of a decidedly Cimabuesque influence A further detachment from the master Cimabue will take place with the subsequent Rucellai Madonna (1285) where Duccio will introduce Gothic elements that will never characterize Cimabue's work.
