= Castelfiorentino Madonna =

C. 1283 painting by Cimabue

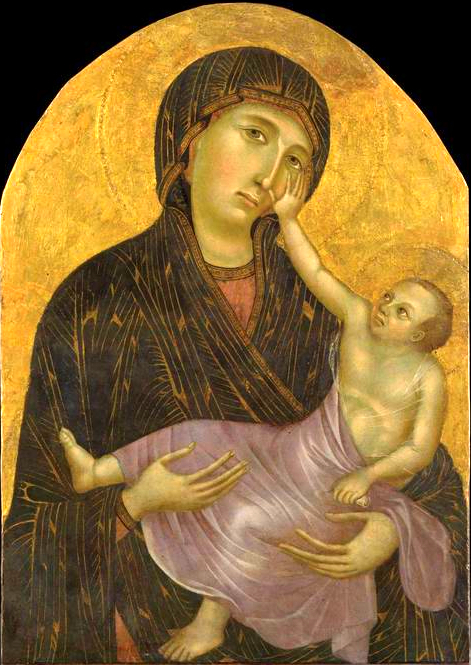
Castelfiorentino Madonna (c. 1283–1284) attributed to Cimabue

The Castelfiorentino Madonna is a tempera-and-gold-on-panel painting attributed to the Italian painter Cimabue, dating to c.1283–1284. Showing a half-length Madonna Odigitria-type Madonna, it originally hung in the collegiate church of Santi Lorenzo e Leonardo but now hangs in the Museo di Santa Verdiana in Castelfiorentino.

Over time it has been attributed to various artists, particularly Duccio di Buoninsegna due to its similarities with his Crevole Madonna or Cimabue or a collaboration between the two. After a 1930–1931 restoration by Giorgina Lucarini it was more precisely attributed to Cimabue by most art historians, including Miklos Boskovitz and Luciano Bellosi, the two main experts on medieval Tuscan art, drawing on Duccio's slightly earlier Crevole Madonna. There is also a theory that a young Giotto could have contributed to the work.

== Bibliography (in Italian) ==
- Rosanna Caterina Proto Pisani, Museo di Santa Verdiana a Castelfiorentino, Edizioni Polistampa, Firenze 2006. ISBN 88-596-0067-7
- Eugenio Battisti, Cimabue, Milano, Istituto Editoriale Italiano, 1963.
- Luciano Bellosi, Cimabue, Milano, Federico Motta Editore, 2004. ISBN 88-7179-452-4
- Ilaria Ciseri, Ciro Castelli e Francesca Bettini, Il restauro della Madonna col Bambino, attribuita a Cimabue, del Museo Santa Verdiana di Castelfiorentino, Firenze, Centro Di, 2009 (OPD restauro: rivista dell'Opificio delle pietre dure e Laboratori di restauro di Firenze: 21, 2009).
