= Madonna with Child and Six Angels =

Painting by Duccio di Buoninsegna

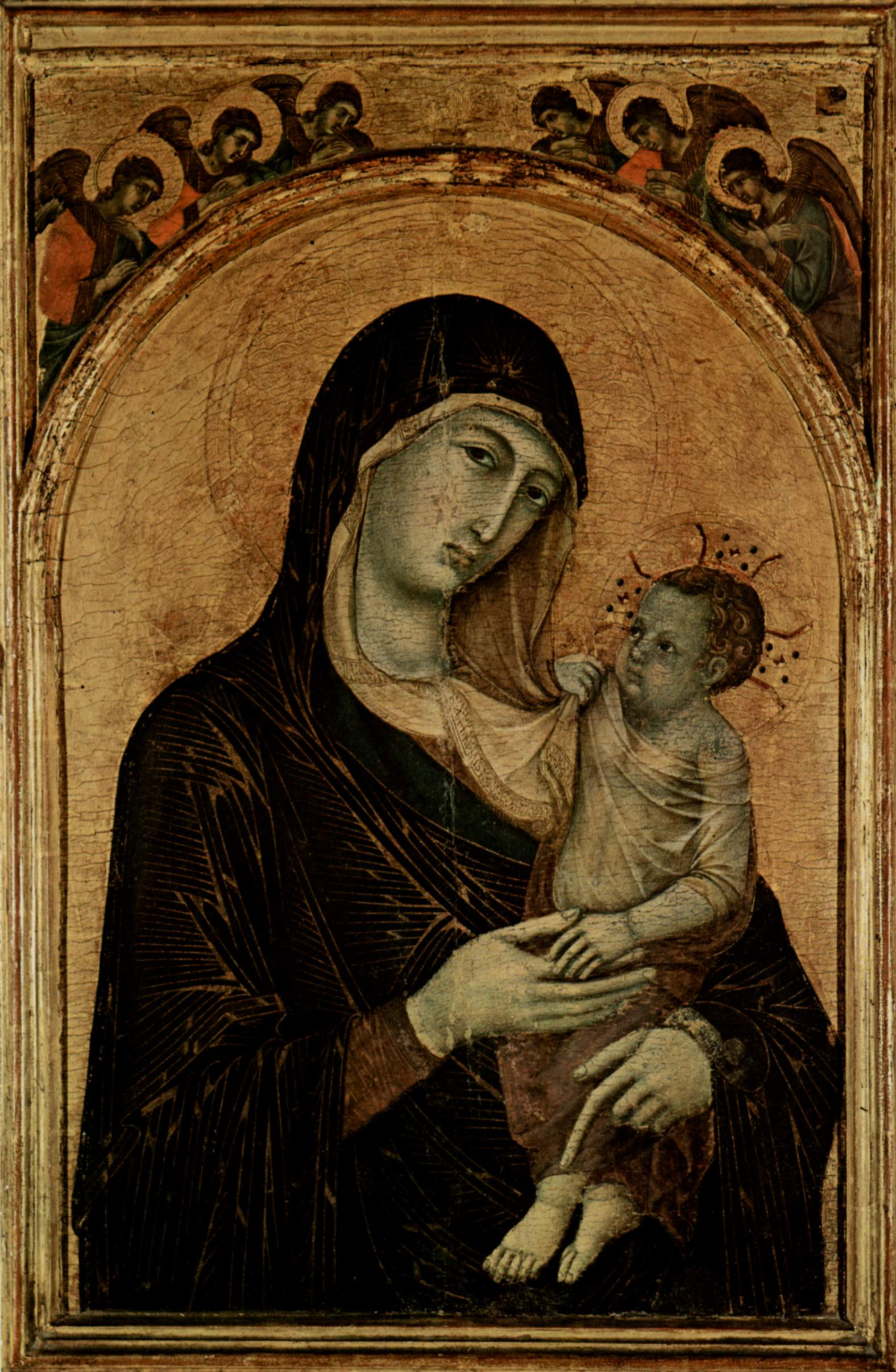
Madonna with Child and Six Angels

Madonna with Child and Six Angels, or The Perugia Madonna, is a Madonna painting by Gothic artist Duccio di Buoninsegna.

It was painted between 1300 and 1305, (tempera and gold on wood) and is located at the Galleria Nazionale dell'Umbria, in Perugia, Italy. The painting had been kept above the sacristy door of the monastery of San Domenico in Perugia until 1863. The painting was attributed to Duccio by Curt Weigelt in 1911. Restoration revealed the painting to be the central panel of a former polyptych.

== See also ==
- Roman Catholic Marian art
