= Segna di Bonaventura =

Italian painter

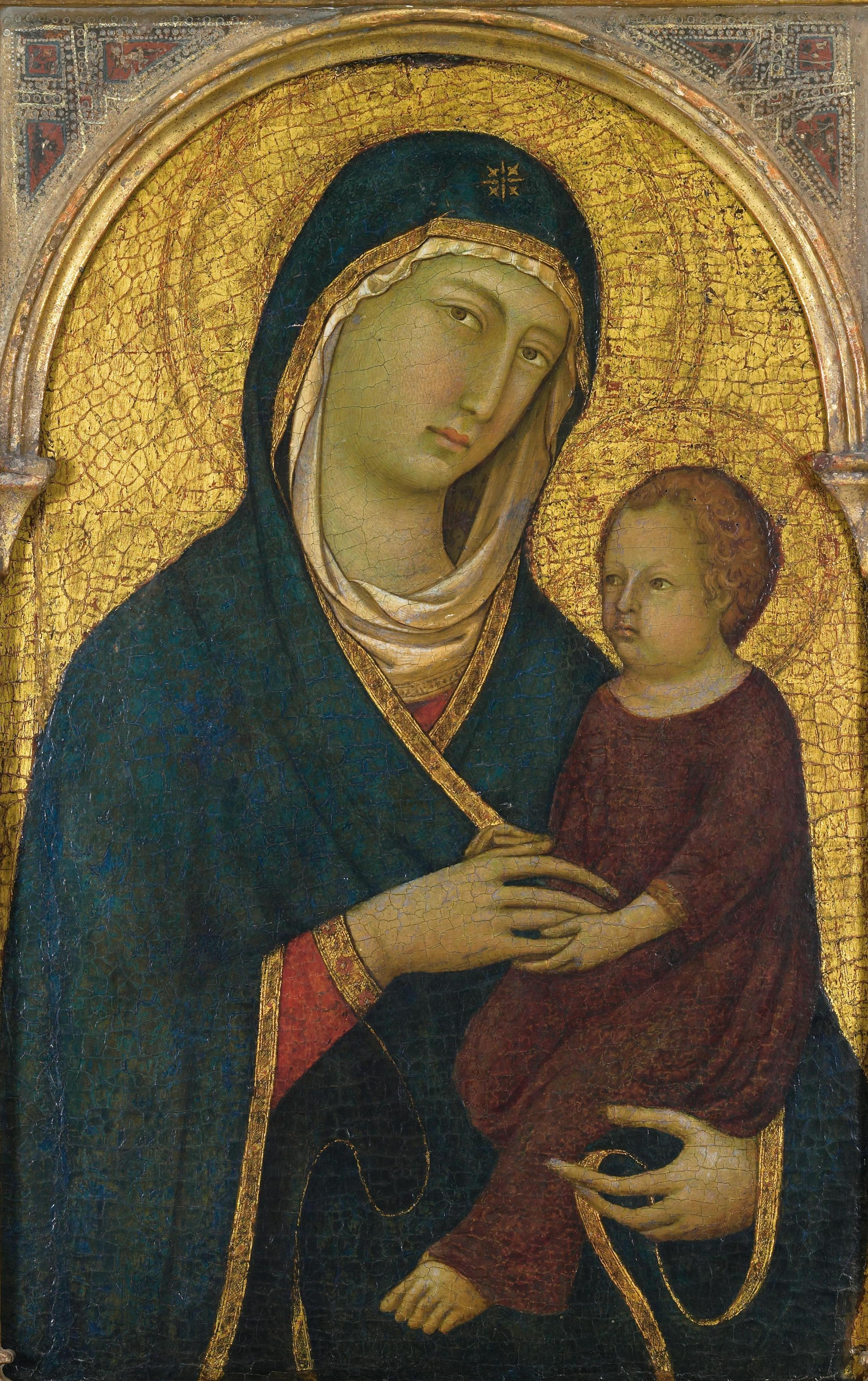
Madonna and Child, painting by Segna di Bonaventura, c. 1325-30, Honolulu Museum of Art

Segna di Bonaventura, also known as Segna de Bonaventura, and as Segna di Buonaventura, was an Italian painter of the Sienese School. He was active from about 1298 to 1331.

In 1306 he painted a panel for the office of the Biccherna in the Palazzo Pubblico in Siena. In 1317 he painted an altar panel for the convent of Lecceto (near Siena). In 1319 he repaired a figure of the Virgin in the Palazzo Pubblico. In 1321 he painted a panel for the Palazzo Pubblico. Segna di Bonaventura’s sons Niccolò di Segna and Francesco di Segna di Bonaventura were also painters of the Sienese School.

Like his uncle Duccio, Segna di Bonaventura’s paintings are characterized by graceful curvilinear rhythms and subtle blends of colors. The Alte Pinakothek (Munich), the Honolulu Museum of Art, the Metropolitan Museum of Art, the Minneapolis Institute of Arts, the North Carolina Museum of Art, and the Pinacoteca Nazionale di Siena are among the public collections having paintings by Segna di Bonaventura.

== Gallery ==
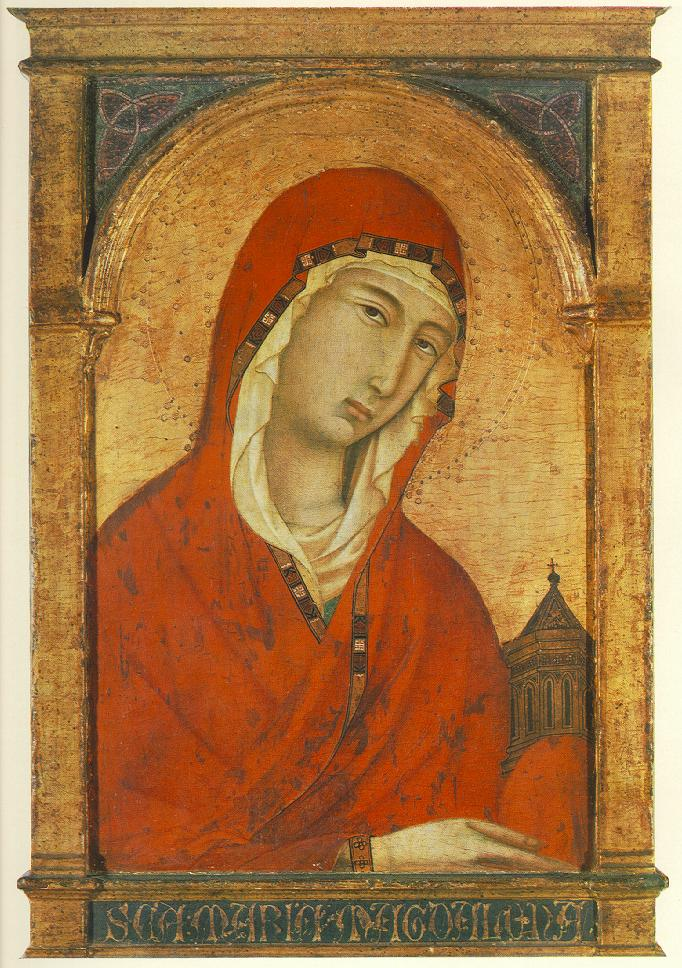
Mary Magdalen, painting on wood by Segna di Bonaventura, c. 1320, Alte Pinakothek, Munich

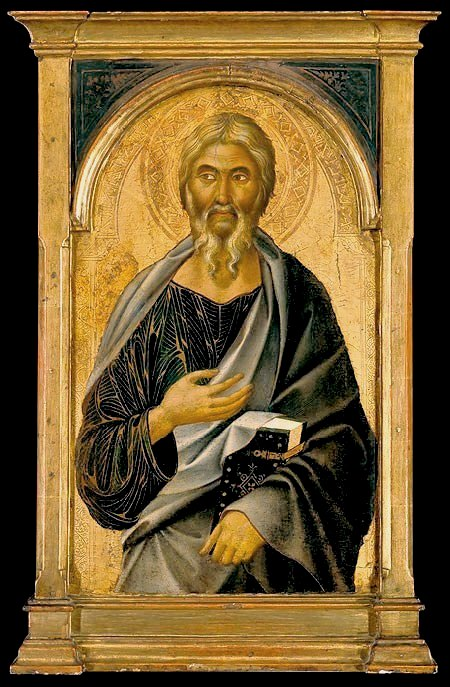
St. John the Evangelist, painting by Segna di Bonaventura, 1320s, Metropolitan Museum of Art, New York City

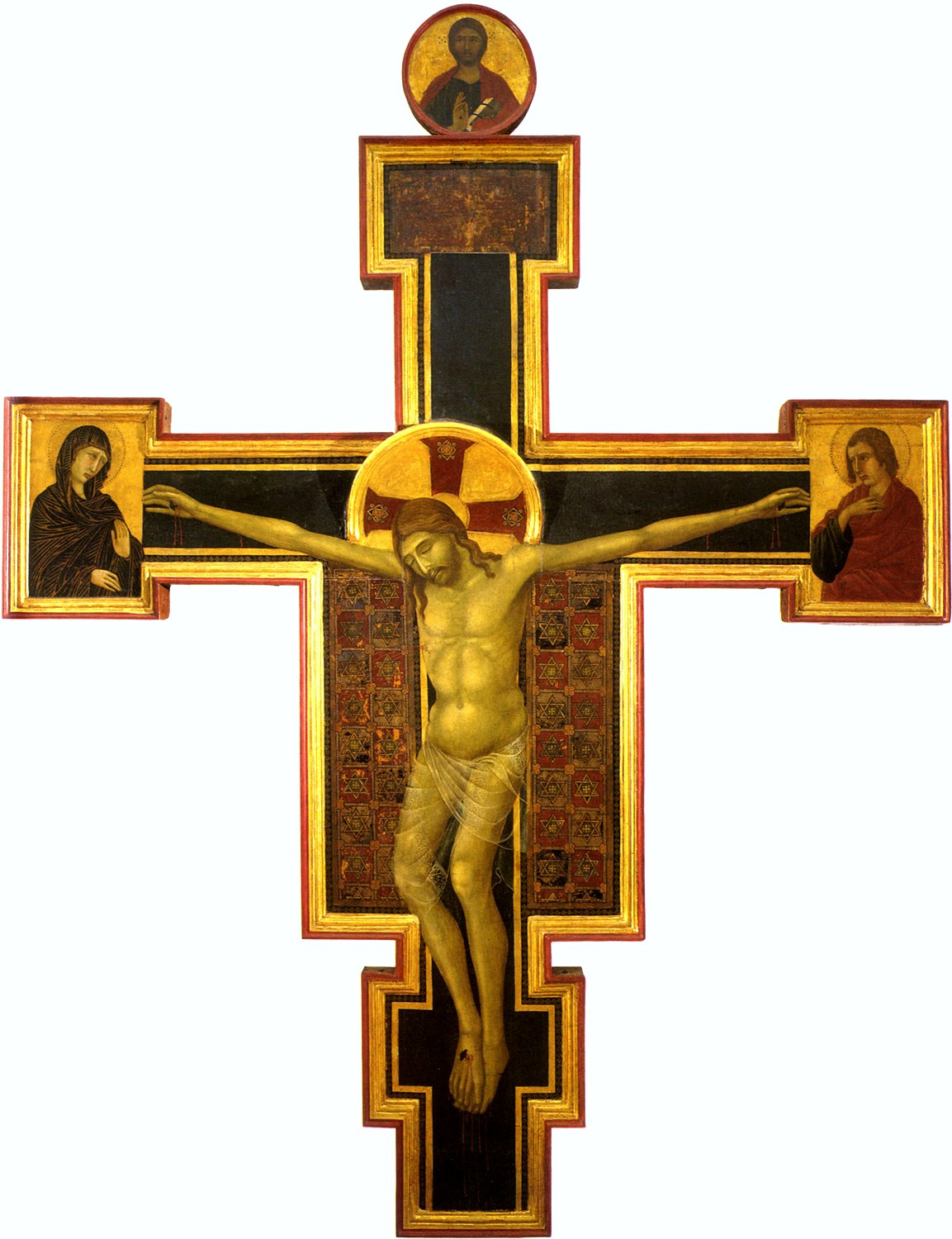
Crucifix by Segna di Bonaventura, 1310–15, Pinacoteca Nazionale di Siena

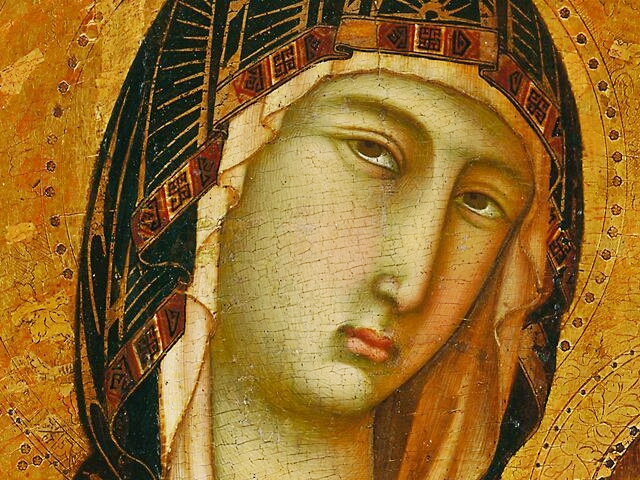
Madonna with Child (detail), painting by Segna di Bonaventura, c. 1310, Minneapolis Institute of Arts
