= Ugolino di Nerio =

Italian painter

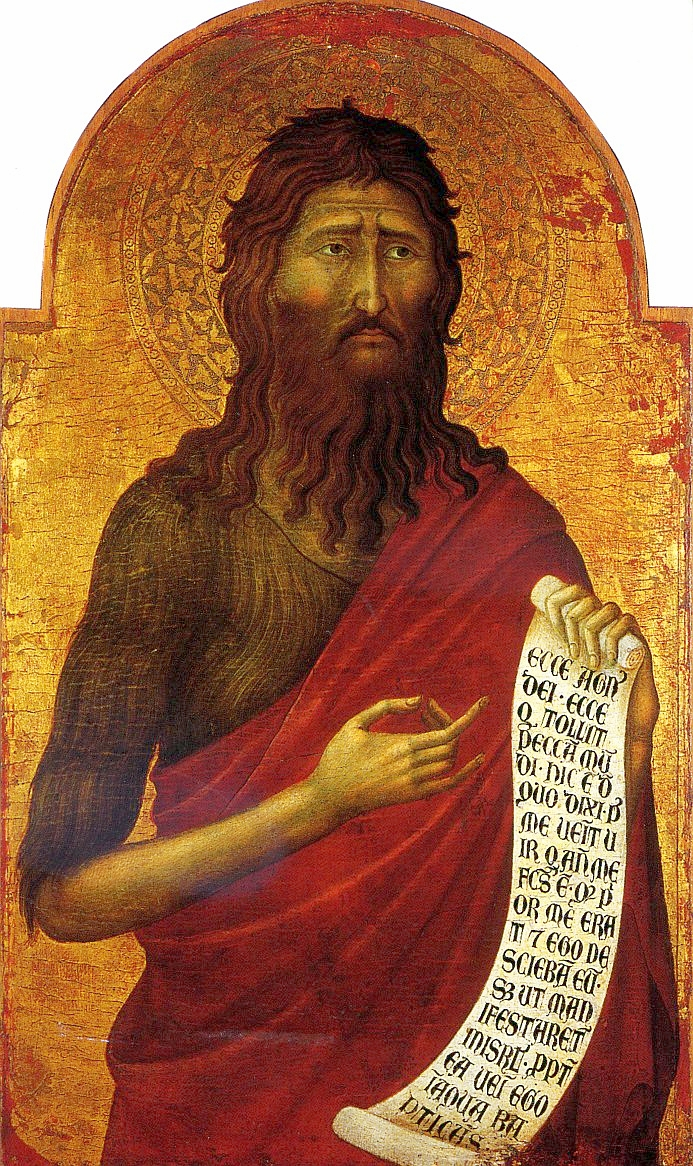
St. John the Baptist, National Museum in Poznań, Poland

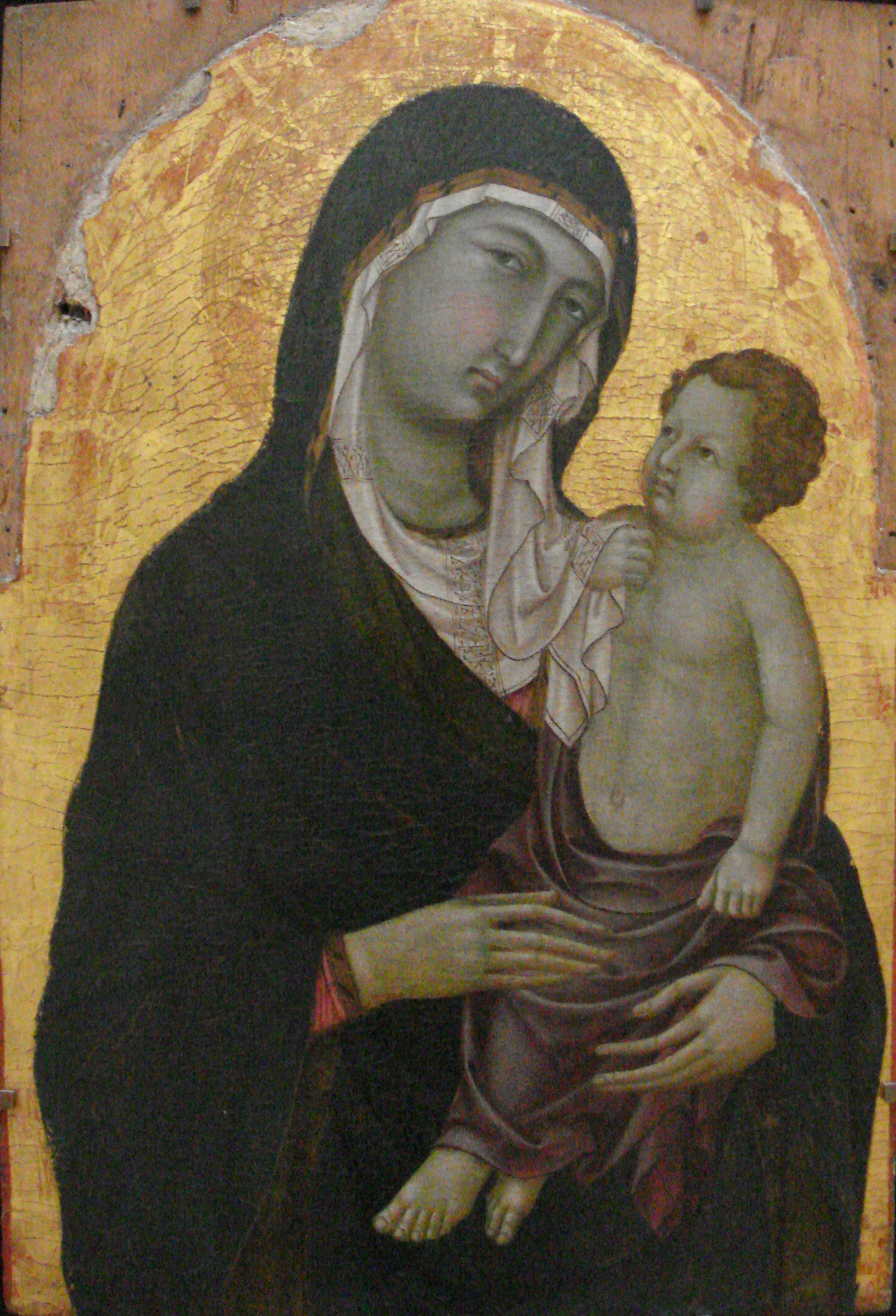
Virgin and Child, 1315–1320, Sienne. Notice the Pseudo-Kufic inscriptions on the veil of the Virgin.

Ugolino di Nerio (1280? – 1349) was an Italian painter active in his native city of Siena and in Florence between the years 1317 and 1327.

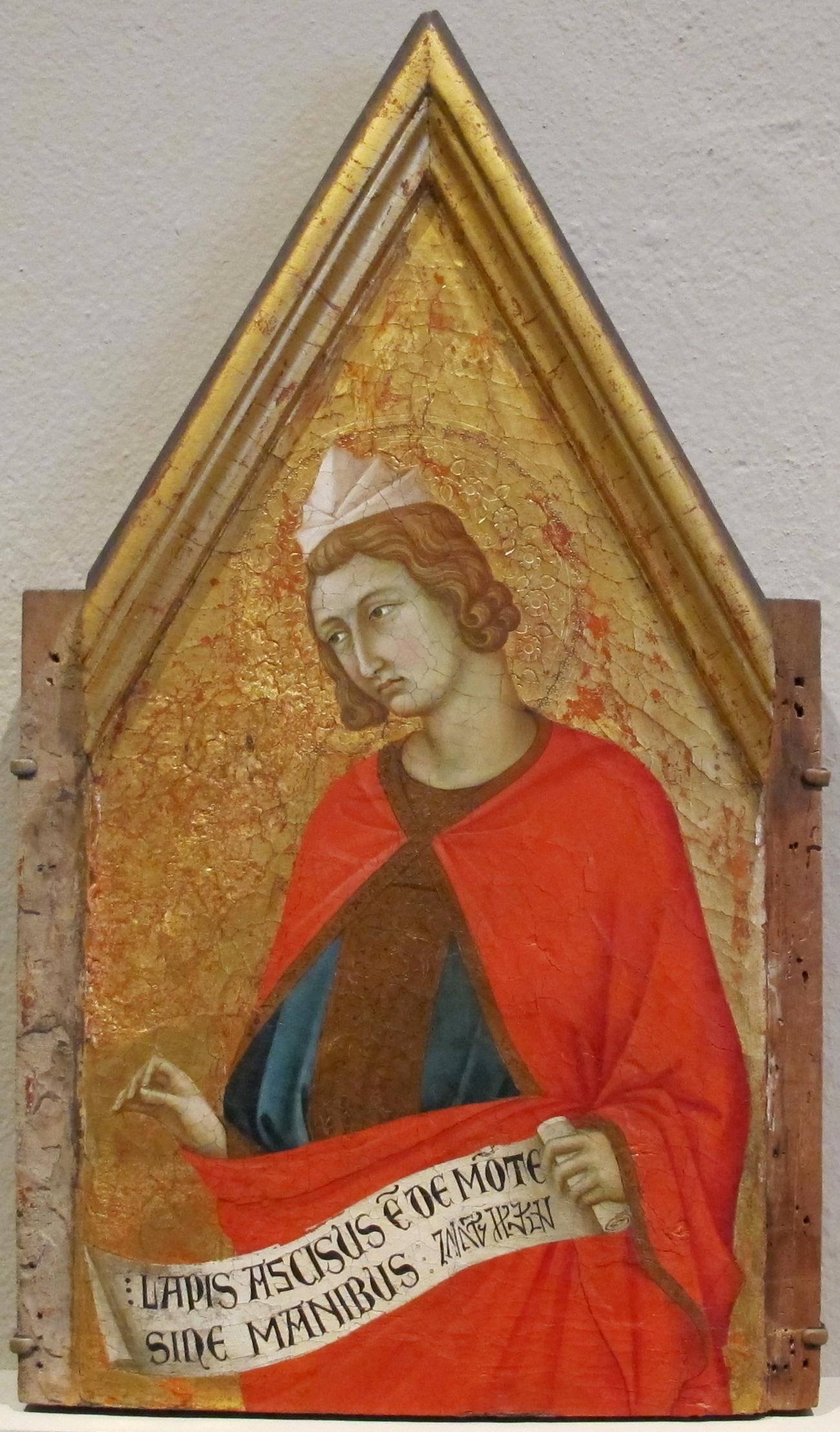
Daniel the Prophet, c. 1325, Ugolino di Nerio, pinnacle from an altarpiece, tempera and tooled gold on panel (Philadelphia Museum of Art)

He was a follower of Duccio di Buoninsegna, from whose Maestà some of his scenes are clearly derived. He was a leading master who contributed to the spread of Sienese painting in Florence by earning commissions to paint in the two main basilicas there, Santa Maria Novella and Santa Croce.

== Biography and works ==
Nerio was born around 1280 in Siena to a family of painters. His father as well as his siblings, Guido and Muccio, were artists. His only known signed work is his altarpiece for the main altar of Saint Croce, dated around 1325. The signature is now lost but was recorded by Vasari. The work was moved from the main altar in 1566 to make way for a ciborium designed by Vasari. It was reassembled in the friars' dormitory where it remained until, at some time around the beginning of the 19th century, it was broken up and the surviving parts sold to William Young Ottley, an English collector. Today the panels are scattered in several museums around the world. The National Gallery in London has eleven. Studies of this work have resulted in putative reconstructions.

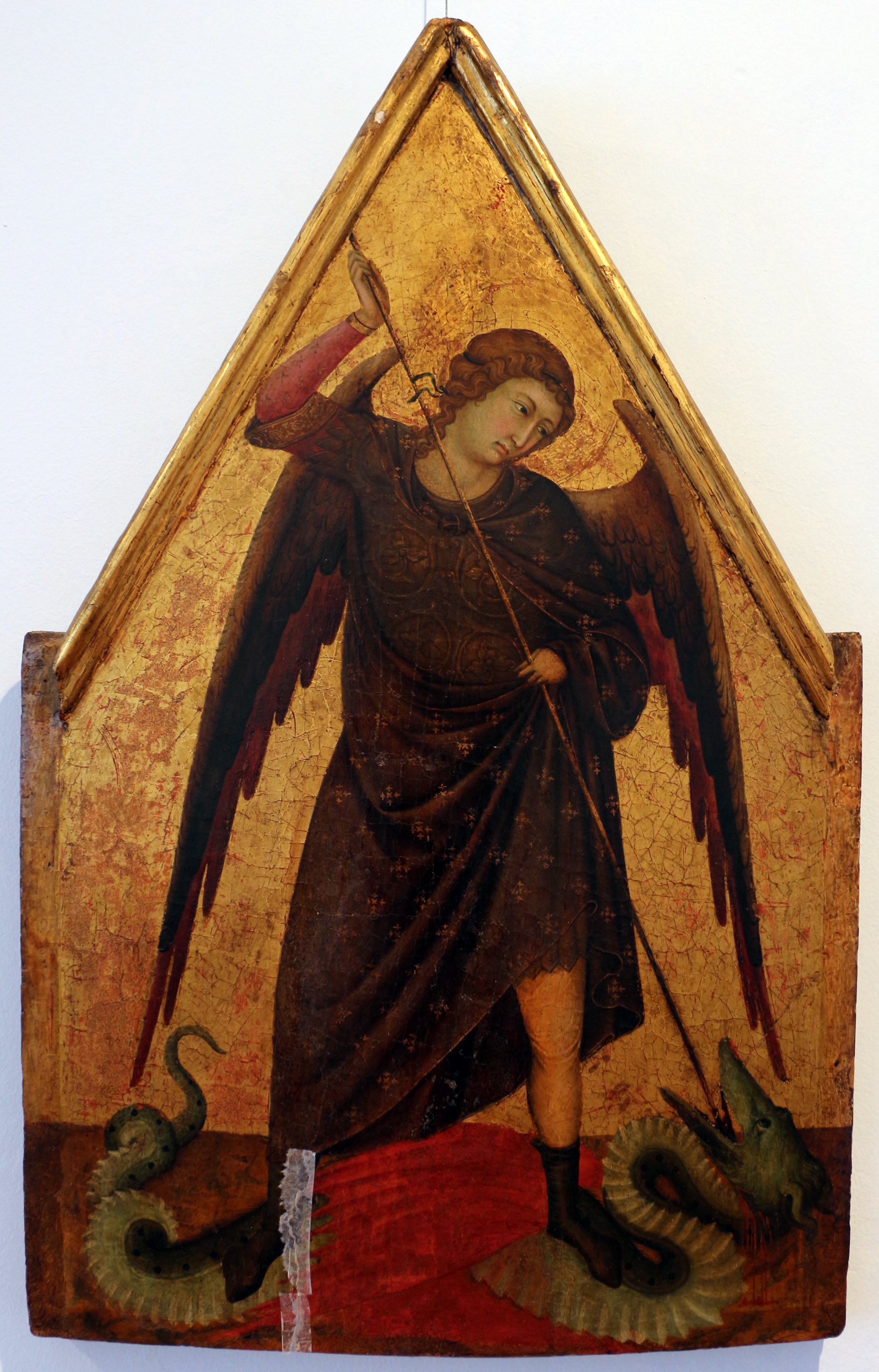
Archangel Michael

Ugolino di Nerio emerged as an independent master around 1315. His early paintings like the Madonna Contini Bonaccossi in the Pitti Palace, are painted in a style drawn from that of Duccio. From about 1320 a distinct mature style emerges, spiritual and elegant. His choice of brighter colours was perhaps influenced by Simone Martini.

Evidence of di Nerio's fondness for painting pious subject matter can be seen in his iconic depictions of Mary Magdalene and Louis of Toulouse, which were both executed in 1328. Both of these paintings utilize the rich and vibrant colors that he was known for using, especially since the dominant colors in these two particular pieces are bright red and gold.

The altarpiece for Santa Croce was the most important commission in a series of works that the Franciscans entrusted to him. At least eight polyptychs have survived in parts. Other important polyptychs are in the Cleveland Museum of Art and the Clark Art Institute, Williamstown, Massachusetts. His best-known Madonna is in the Chiesa della Misericordia, San Casciano in Val di Pesa; there is another in the Louvre.

According to Vasari he died in Siena.

== Sources ==
- Davies, Martin. In: "National Gallery Catalogues: Catalogue of the Earlier Italian Schools". National Gallery Catalogues, London 1961, reprinted 1986, ISBN 0-901791-29-6
