= Gualino Madonna =

Painting by Duccio di Buoninsegna

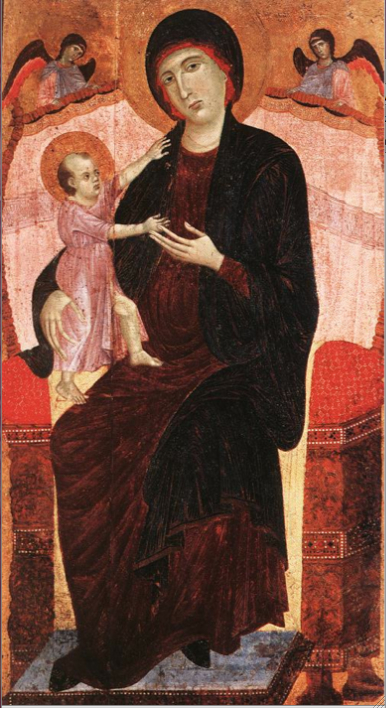
- Artist: Cimabue
- Year: 1280–1283
- Type: Tempera and gold on wood
- Dimensions: 157 cm × 86 cm (62 in × 34 in)
- Location: Galleria Sabauda; Turin

The Gualino Madonna is a painting attributed to Cimabue, precursor to the Italian primitives, after having been attributed for some time to one of his contemporaries, Duccio di Buoninsegna. It is housed in the Galleria Sabauda of Turin, northern Italy.

== History ==
The provenance of the panel is unknown. In 1910 it was sold on the Florence antiquary market covered by a 16th-century repainting, which was removed in 1920. In 1925 it was acquired by the Turinese entrepreneur and collector Riccardo Gualino who, in 1930, gave it to the Galleria Sabauda. In 1933-1959 it was in the Embassy of Italy, London, after which it returned to the Turinese museum.

The work is not signed, and has been initially assigned to the early career of Duccio di Buoninsegna, due in particular to its less refined style. However, more recent studies suggest a more convincing attribution to Cimabue, in particular because of the use of specific painting methods (granitura) or ornamental decorations (star-shaped flowers).

== Sources ==
- Cimabue : Aux origines de la peinture italienne. Louvre et Silvana Editoriale. 2025. ISBN 9788836658848.
- Duccio. Milan: Silvana Editore. 2003. ISBN 88-8215-679-6.
