= Odigitria =

Prehistoric tombs in southern Crete

Coordinates: 34.9753°N 24.7998°E

Odigitria is the archaeological site of an ancient Minoan religious complex, which includes two tholos tombs located near the modern Odigitria Monastery in the Asterousia mountains of southern Crete.

The tombs are dated from Early Minoan I to Middle Minoan IA and were excavated in 1979 by N. Dimopoulou and in 1980 by Antonis Vasilakis. They were in use for more than 1,000 years. Artifacts found include seals, amulets, necklaces, gold diadems, stone blades, stone vases, pots and a gold bracelet.
