= Niccolò di Segna =

Italian painter

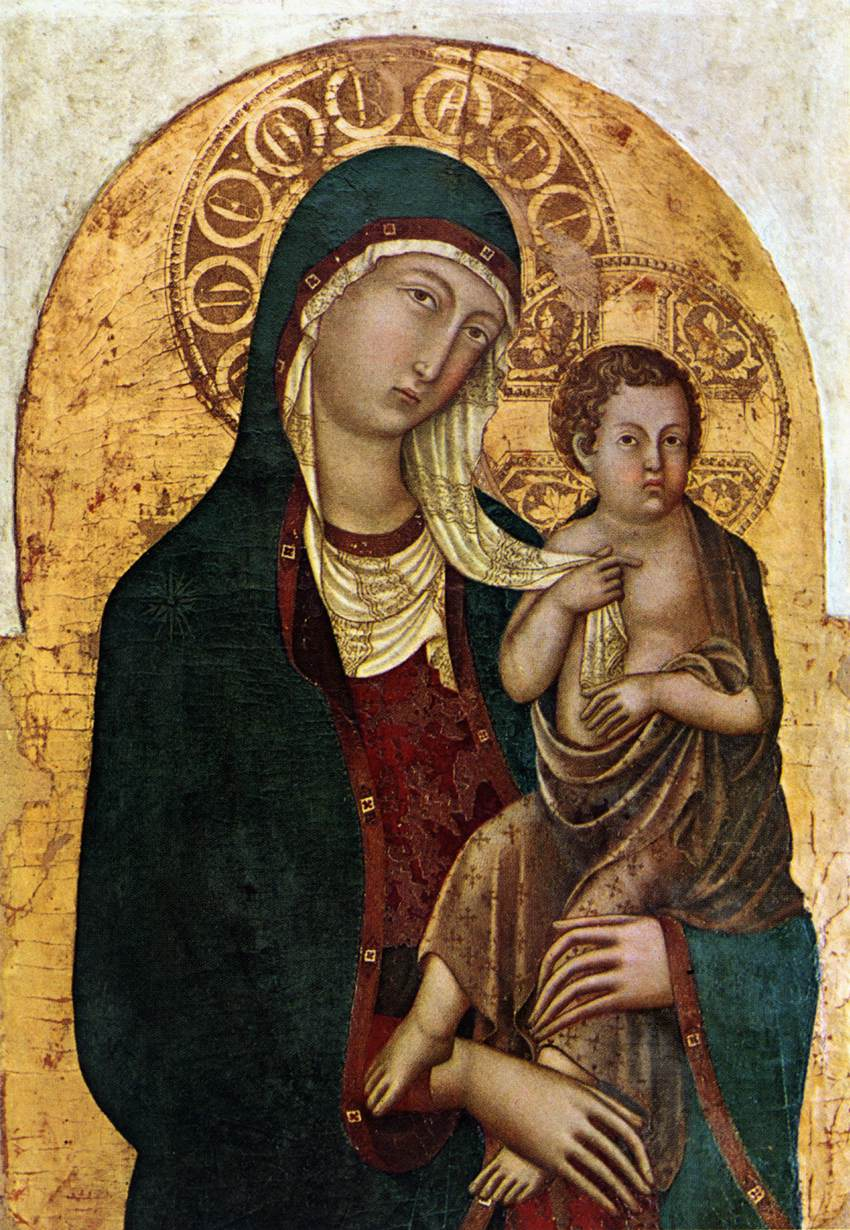
Madonna with Child. Diocesan Museum, Cortona.

Niccolò di Segna (died around 1348) was an Italian painter from Siena. His activity is documented starting from 1331.

Influenced by Duccio di Buoninsegna and Simone Martini, he was an exponent of the Sienese School. He collaborated with Pietro Lorenzetti to the frescoes in Santa Maria dei Servi (Siena) and painted. Other works by him can be found in the Pinacoteca Nazionale at Siena (Madonna della Misericordia, Madonna with Child, St. Michael Archangel and others), in the Cathedral of Sansepolcro (Resurrection Polyptych, at the high altar), the Diocesan Museum of Cortona and other collections in Italy and abroad.

== Sources ==
- Elisabetta Nardinocchi, ed. (2011). Guida al Museo Horne. Florence: Edizioni Polistampa. ISBN 978-88-596-0969-8.

"Saint Lucy"by Niccolo di Segna, Walters Art Museum, Baltimore
