= The Mocking of Christ (disambiguation) =

The Mocking of Christ refers to the mocking of Jesus as portrayed in the Bible.

The Mocking of Christ may also refer to:

- The Mocking of Christ (Cimabue)
- The Mocking of Christ (van Dyck)
- The Mocking of Christ (Grünewald)
- Christ Crowned with Thorns (Annibale Carracci), or Mocking of Christ
