= The Mocking of Christ (Cimabue) =

Painting by Cimabue

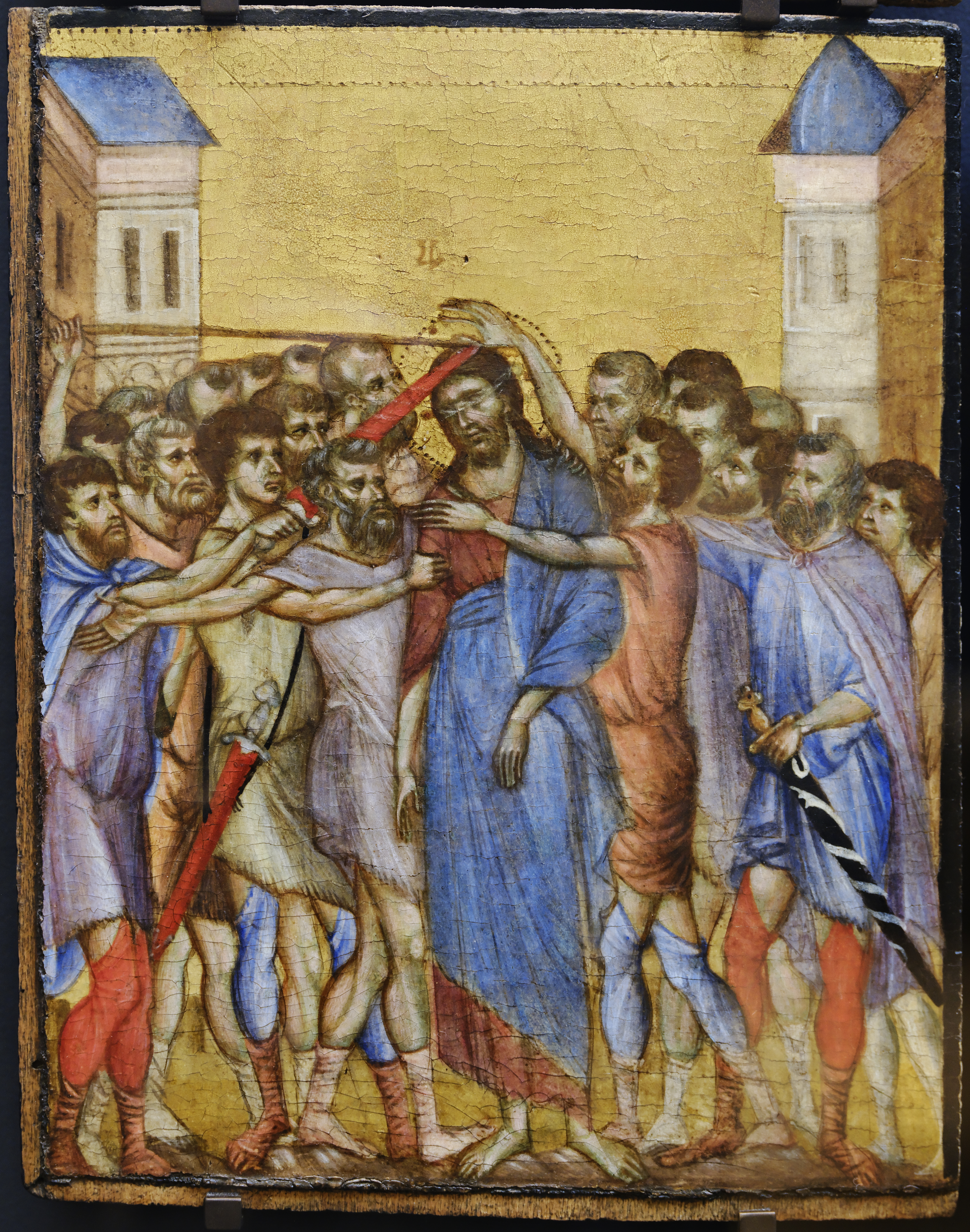
- The painting after restoration.
- Artist: Cimabue
- Year: c. 1280
- Medium: Tempera and gold leaf on poplar panel
- Dimensions: 25.8 cm × 20.3 cm (10.2 in × 8.0 in)
- Designation: National treasure of France (2019)
- Location: Louvre, Paris

The Mocking of Christ (or Christ Mocked) is a small 13th-century panel painting by the Italian artist Cimabue, in tempera on a poplar panel. It depicts the mocking of Jesus and is one of three panels known from Cimabue's Diptych of Devotion.

It was discovered in the kitchen of an elderly woman in northern France. It sold at auction In October 2019 for €24 million, a record for an artwork predating the 16th century. It is believed to be the first work by Cimabue to have been auctioned. Following an export ban, it was acquired by the Louvre in 2023.

== Description ==
The Mocking of Christ measures 25.8 cm × 20.3 cm × 1.2 cm (10.16 in × 7.99 in × 0.47 in) and depicts the mocking of Jesus prior to his crucifixion. The work is painted with egg tempera on a gold leaf background, on a thinned and slightly bowed poplar panel prepared with layers of gesso ground in which a canvas is embedded. It is thought to date from 1280.

The panel is thought to be part of a diptych with four painted scenes on each wing, depicting the passion of Christ, sometimes known as the Diptych of Devotion. Two other scenes by Cimabue, painted on wood panels of similar size, have been identified as parts of the same diptych: the Virgin and Child with Two Angels in the collection of the National Gallery in London (discovered in Suffolk in 2000) and The Flagellation of Christ, in the Frick Collection in New York since 1950.

The Mocking of Christ is one of only a dozen works that have been attributed to Cimabue, none of which were signed by the artist. It shares similarities with Cimabue's other works in the way that the facial expressions and buildings are depicted and in the use of light and perspective. The National Gallery describes the polyptych as representing "a crucial moment in the history of art" as it comes from a time when Italian painters began to move away from the Byzantine tradition towards a more naturalistic representation of events.

It is the only known small-scale work by Cimabue to use the same techniques to depict a crowd of figures seen in other, larger-scale works, such as his frescoes at Assisi. The scene follows the biblical account in Matthew 27:27–30. Christ, in a red robe and blue cloak, is standing at the centre of the composition, with his eyes uncovered in the Byzantine style: in contemporary depictions from Northern Europe, he would be seated and blindfolded. He is impassive, with arms limp and a sorrowful expression, among a crowd of slightly shorter men who are angrily striking Christ with rods, a sheathed sword, or their bare hands; one appears to be reaching up to remove Christ's halo. To either side stands a person with a sheathed sword; buildings in the background in Byzantine reverse perspective frame the scene under a luminous gold sky.

An infrared reflectogram has revealed Cimabue's underdrawing. Damage to the paint shows the panel was removed from the bottom left corner of a frame, and the edges have been evened up with a dark border. It is suspected that an original red border is underneath, like the two other surviving paintings from the diptych, which also show similar woodworm holes. With the other two panels, they appear to be three of a set of four panels, with the upper right panel missing. A reconstruction of an unusual eight-panel Florentine diptych of c. 1320 by the Master of San Martino alla Palma suggests that the fourth panel would be a crowd scene of the Betrayal of Christ, while the four panels of a hypothesised second leaf would depict the Way to Calvary, the Crucifixion, the Entombment, and the Last Judgment. A similar Venetian diptych of c. 1300 in the Virginia Museum of Fine Arts also has six Passion scenes, with the Virgin and Child and the Last Judgment. All seem to be associated with communities of Clarissan nuns in northern Italy.

== Discovery and sale ==
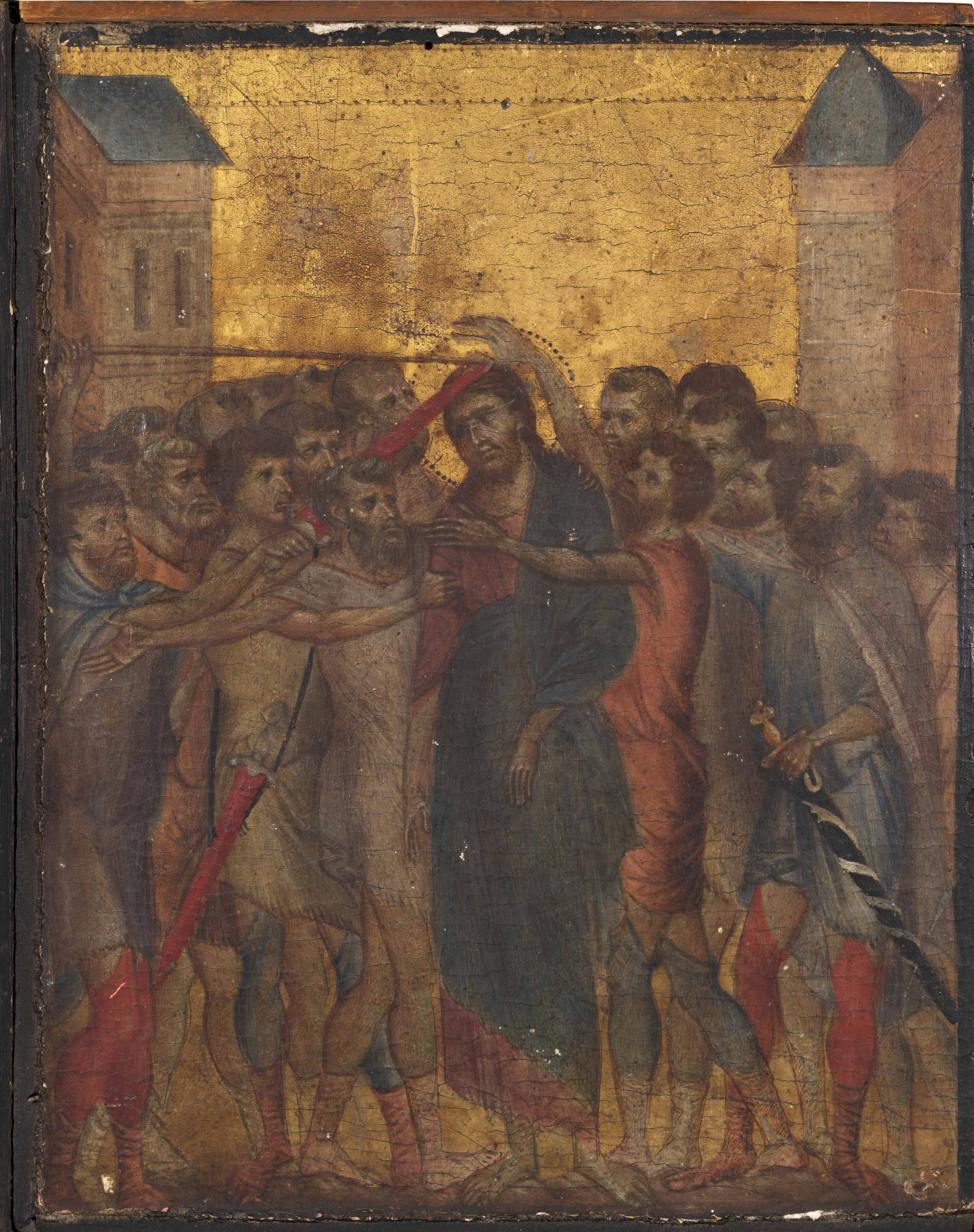
The painting in 2019

The painting was discovered hanging above the hotplate in the kitchen of an elderly woman living in Compiègne, northern France. The woman was in her nineties and was selling the house, which had been built in the 1960s, and moving from the area. Ahead of the move in June 2019 the owner called in a local auctioneer to determine if any of her possessions were worth selling; the remainder were to be thrown away. The owner and her family recognised the Mocking of Christ only as an old religious icon and thought it had little value. The owner could not remember how the work came to be in her possession, but thought it to be of Russian origin.

The auctioneer had only one week to evaluate the contents of the house, but noticed the Mocking of Christ almost immediately. They thought it to be of an Italian primitivist nature and possibly worth €300,000 to €400,000. The owner was advised to send it away for testing, and it went to Eric Turquin and his colleagues at the Turquin Gallery in Paris. Testing under infrared light revealed similarities with other works by Cimabue, and it was attributed to the artist. Some other items from the house sold at auction for €6,000 and the remainder were sent to landfill.

The work was put up for auction at the Actéon Hôtel des Ventes, in Senlis, Oise, on 27 October 2019 with an estimate of €4–6 million. Some 800 people attended the auction and there was interest from several foreign museums. The work reached a hammer price of €19.5 million, which reached €24 million once selling fees were included. The winning bid was placed by the London-based dealer Fabrizio Moretti, on behalf of two anonymous collectors. This set a new world record for a pre-1500 artwork sold at auction. The price was believed to be so high as it was the first time a work by Cimabue had sold at auction. Both seller and purchaser decided to remain anonymous, though the buyers have been reported to be two Chilean nationals living in the United States. On 23 December 2019 the French government put in place a 30-month ban on export of the work. It was hoped that funds could be raised to purchase it so it can go on display at the Louvre alongside the artist's Maestà. It was finally acquired by the Louvre in November 2023.

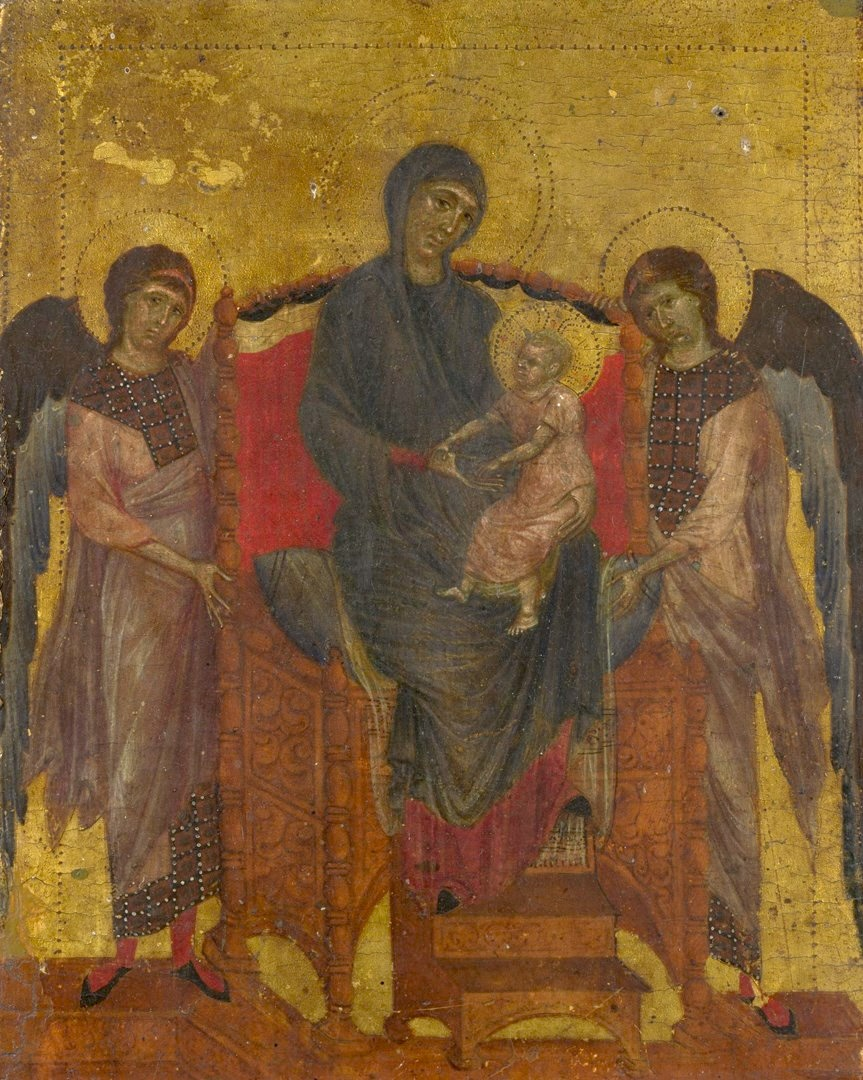
Cimabue, Virgin and Child with Two Angels, National Gallery

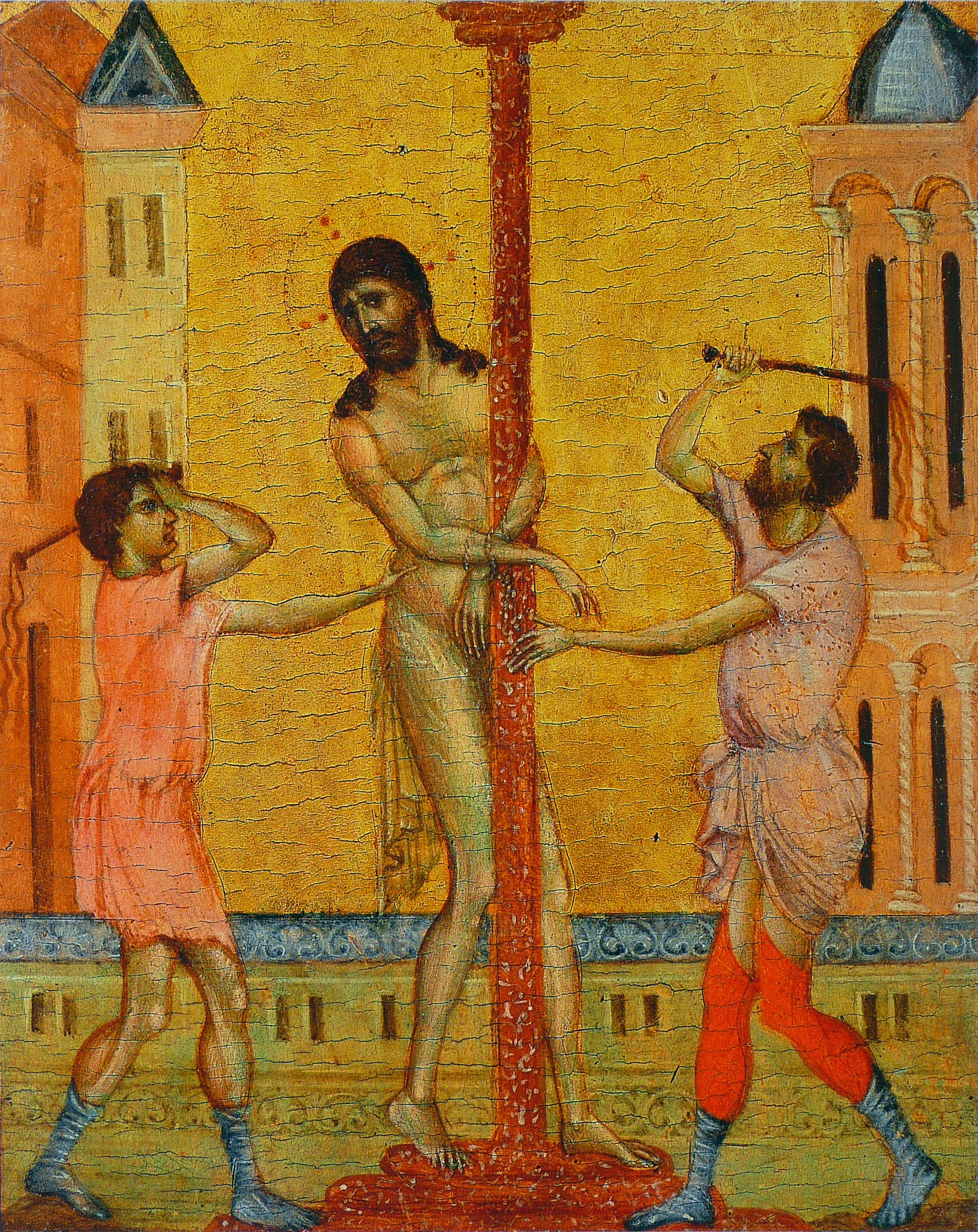
Cimabue, The Flagellation of Christ, Frick Collection

A proposed reconstruction of the Diptych of Devotion

== See also ==
- The Mocking of Christ (Grünewald)
- The Mocking of Christ (van Dyck)
