= James L. Resseguie =

New Testament scholar

- Born: January 1, 1945 (age 81); Buffalo, NY
- Title: Distinguished professor of New Testament emeritus

Academic background
- Education: Fuller Theological Seminary
- Thesis: Instruction and Discussion in the Central Section of Luke: A Redaction Critical Study of Luke 9:51-19:44 (1978)

Academic work
- Institutions: Winebrenner Theological Seminary
- Main interests: Narrative criticism

James L. Resseguie (born January 1, 1945, Buffalo, NY) is distinguished professor of New Testament emeritus at Winebrenner Theological Seminary, where he held the J. Russell Bucher Chair of New Testament. He received his A.B. from the University of California, Berkeley (1967), his M.Div. from Princeton Theological Seminary (1972), and his Ph.D. from Fuller Theological Seminary (1978). He is an ordained minister of the Presbyterian Church (USA). His research interests include narrative criticism, especially the elements of point of view (literature) and defamiliarization, and reader-response criticism. He has published frequently on the application of such interpretive methods to the Gospel of Luke, Gospel of John, and the Book of Revelation.

== Works ==
=== Thesis ===
- Resseguie, James L. (1978). Instruction and Discussion in the Central Section of Luke: A Redaction Critical Study of Luke 9:51-19:44 (Ph.D.). Fuller Theological Seminary. OCLC 53910892.

=== Books ===
- Resseguie, James L. (1998). Revelation Unsealed: A Narrative Critical Approach to John's Apocalypse. Biblical Interpretation Series. Vol. 32. Leiden & Boston: Brill. ISBN 9789004111295. OCLC 38096895.
- ——— (2001). The Strange Gospel: Narrative Design and Point of View in John. Biblical Interpretation Series. Vol. 56. Leiden & Boston: Brill. ISBN 9789004122062. OCLC 46538608.
- ——— (2004). Spiritual Landscape: Images of the Spiritual Life in the Gospel of Luke. Peabody, MA: Hendrickson Publishers. ISBN 9781565638273. OCLC 52720771.
- ——— (2005). Narrative Criticism of the New Testament: an introduction. Grand Rapids, MI: Baker Academic. ISBN 9780801027895. OCLC 61362694.
- ——— (2008). Narratologia del Nuovo Testamento. Introduzione allo studio della Bibbia - Supplementi. Vol. 38. Brescia: Paideia. ISBN 9788839407504. OCLC 800038962.
- ——— (2009). Revelation of John: A Narrative Commentary. Grand Rapids, MI: Baker Academic. ISBN 9780801032134. OCLC 244563458.
- ——— (2009). L'exégèse narrative du Nouveau Testament: Une introduction. Lessius.

=== Selected chapters ===
- ——— (1993). "John 9: A Literary-Critical Analysis". In Stibbe, Mark W.G. (ed.). An Anthology of Twentieth-Century Literature. Leiden: Brill. pp. 115–22.
- ——— (2013). "The Beloved Disciple: The Ideal Point of View". In Hunt, Steven A.; Tolmie, D. Francois; Zimmermann, Ruben (eds.). Character Studies in the Fourth Gospel: Narrative Approaches to Seventy Figures in John. WUNT. Vol. 314. Tubingen: Mohr Siebeck. pp. 537–49. - reprinted in Character Studies in the Fourth Gospel (Grand Rapids, MI: Eerdmans, 2016), pp. 537–49.
- ——— (2013). "A Narrative-Critical Approach to the Fourth Gospel". In Skinner, Christopher W. (ed.). Characters and Characterization in the Gospel of John. LNTS. Vol. 461. London: T&T Clark. pp. 3–17.
- ——— (2016). "The Woman Who Crashed Simon's Party: A Reader-Response Approach to Luke 7:36-50". In Dicken, Frank E.; Snyder, Julia A. (eds.). Characters and Characterization in Luke-Acts. LNTS. Vol. 548. London: T&T Clark. pp. 7–22.
- ——— (2016). "Point of View". In Sheridan, Ruth; Estes, Douglas (eds.). How John Works: Storytelling in the Fourth Gospel. Resources for Biblical Study. Atlanta, GA: SBL Press. pp. 79–96.
- ——— (2020). "Narrative Features of the Book of Revelation". In Koester, Craig R. (ed.). Oxford Handbook of the Book of Revelation. New York: Oxford University Press. pp. 37–52.

== Sources ==
- "Official biography". Winebrenner Theological Seminary.
