= Diptych of Devotion =

Dismembered altarpiece by Cimabue

Hypothetical reconstruction of the diptych

The Diptych of Devotion was a small altarpiece in tempera and gold on poplar panel, painted in the 1280s by Cimabue. It is thought to have originally consisted of two panels, each with four scenes from the life and passion of Christ. These are thought to have been split up for the art market in the 19th century.

Only three scenes from the left panel are known to have survived: the Virgin and Child with Two Angels (National Gallery, London), the Mocking of Christ (Louvre, Paris) and the Flagellation of Christ (Frick Collection, New York).
