= The Mocking of Christ (Grünewald) =

Painting by Mathias Grünewald

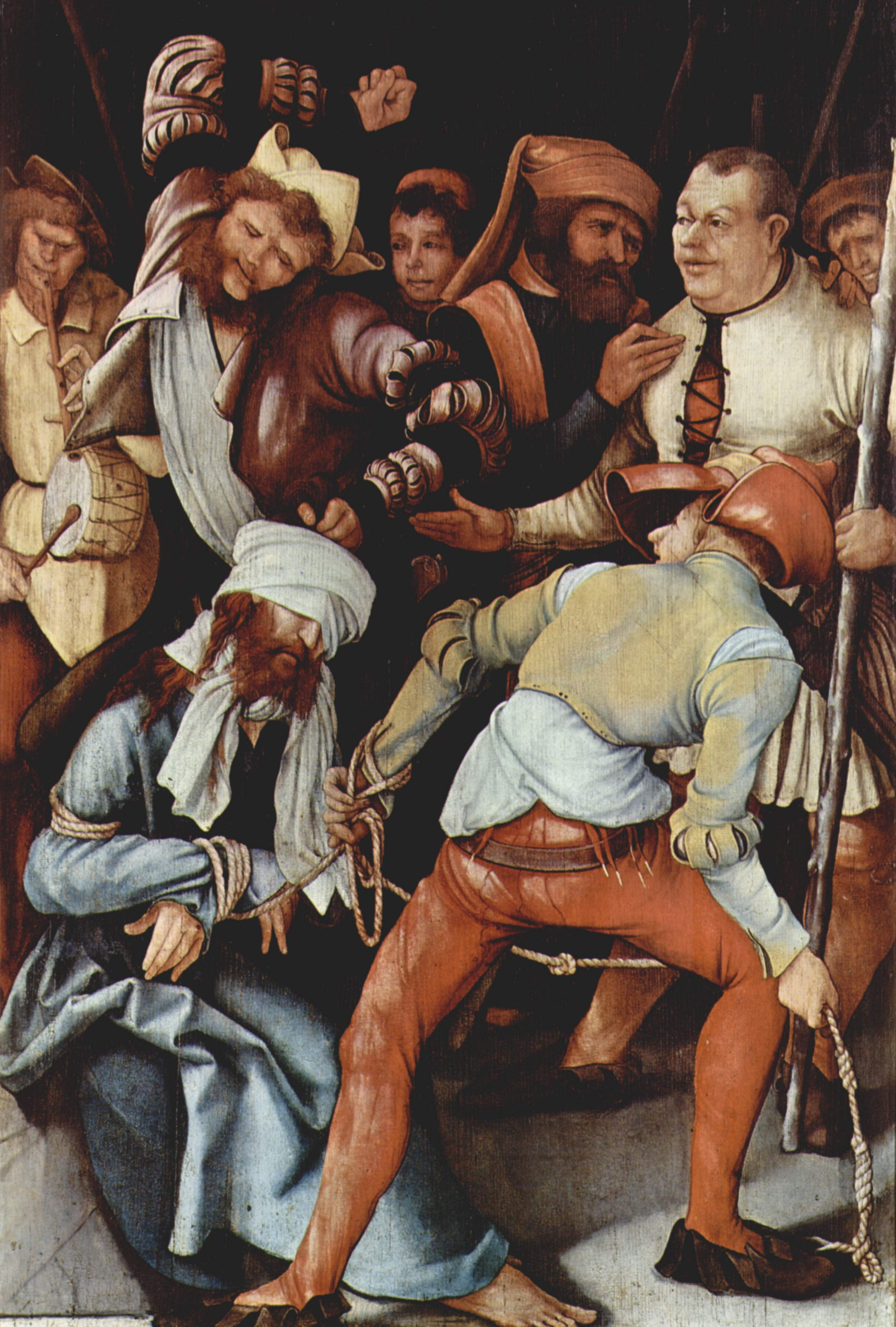
- Artist: Matthias Grünewald
- Year: 1503–1505
- Medium: Oil on wood
- Dimensions: 109 cm × 74.3 cm (43 in × 29.3 in)
- Location: Alte Pinakothek, Munich

The Mocking of Christ (German: Die Verspottung Christi) is an early oil on wood painting (1503–1505) by Matthias Grünewald. It is located today in the Alte Pinakothek, Munich.

== Description ==
Christ sits blindfolded on a low stone wall. His hands and arms are bound with a rope. A torturer who pulls on the rope stands before him, with his back turned to the viewer. Another stands behind Christ and tugs on his hair and has raised his fist to strike him. On the right a man with a staff in his left hand and with his other holds back the second torturer, who appears not to notice him.

An older man faces the man with the staff, and lays his hands upon the latter's shoulders, and appears to be conversing with him. In the background are three further men: on the left a musician who plays a flute with one hand while beating a small drum with the other, a youth near the center of the image, and an older man on the right.

== Details ==
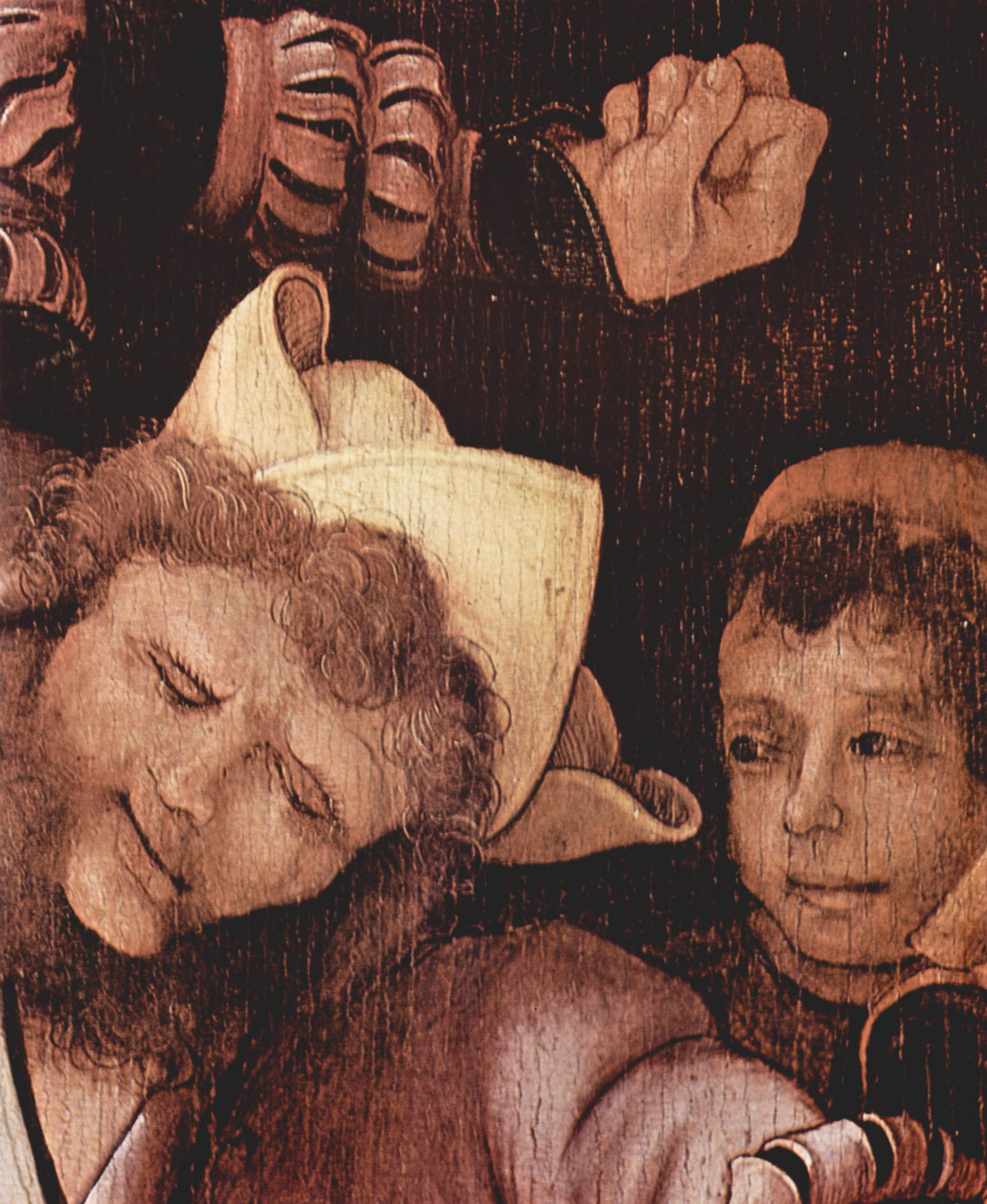
Detail of the mockers

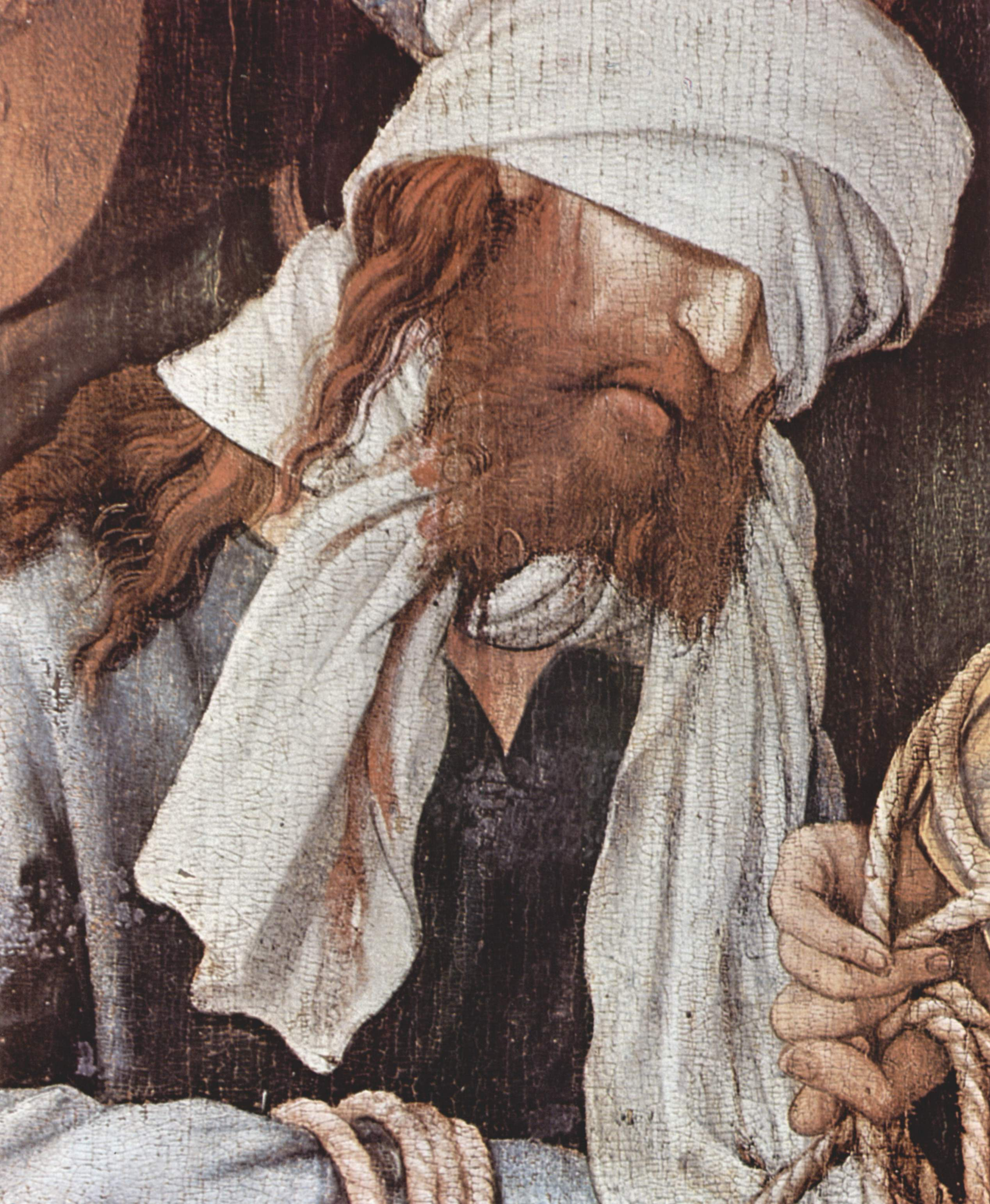
Detail of Christ

== See also ==
- Mocking of Jesus
- The Mocking of Christ (Cimabue)
- The Mocking of Christ (van Dyck)
