= The Flagellation of Christ (Cimabue) =

Painting by Cimabue

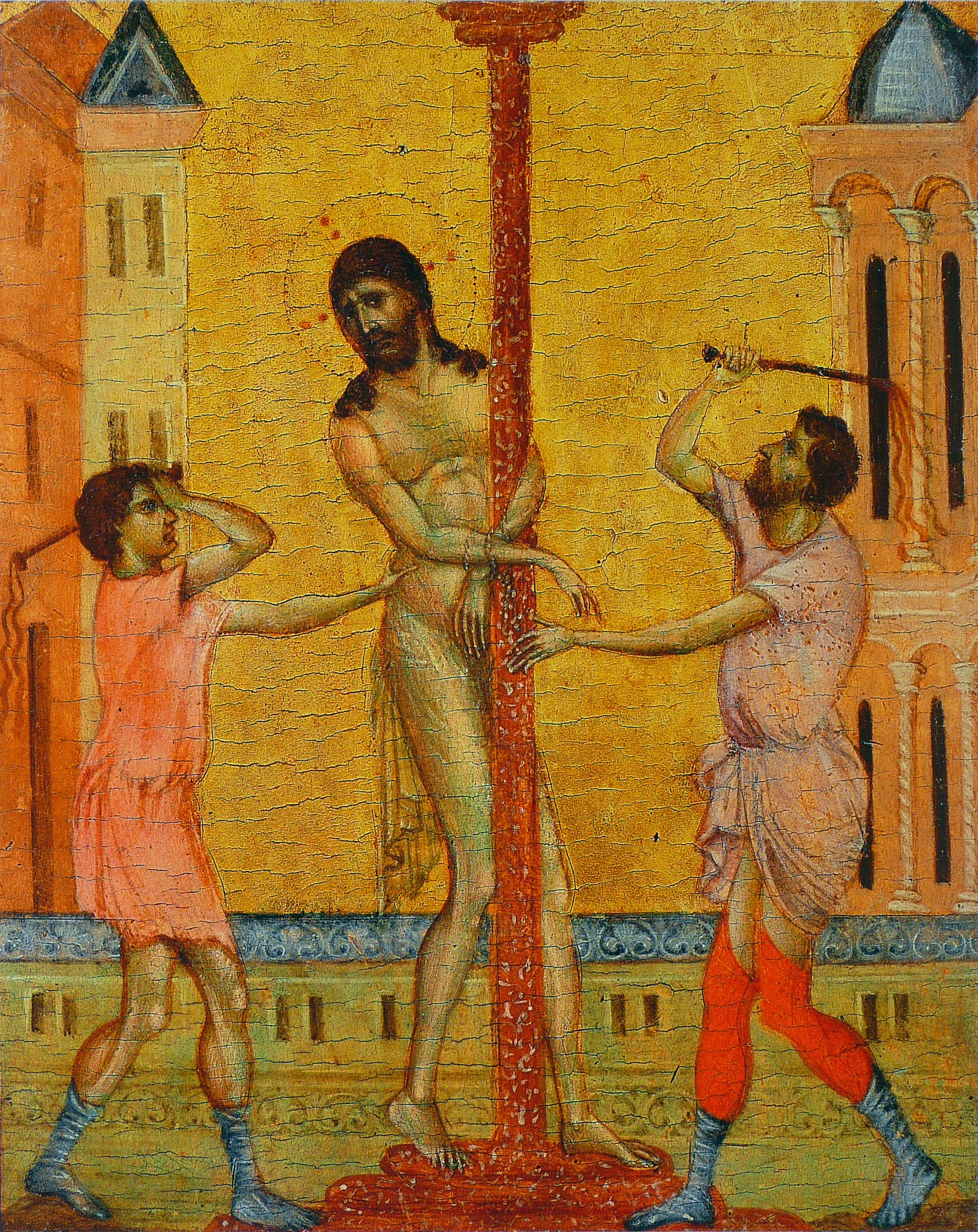
- Artist: Cimabue
- Year: c. 1280
- Medium: Tempera and gold leaf on poplar panel
- Dimensions: 24.7 cm × 20 cm (9.7 in × 7.9 in)
- Location: Frick Collection; New York

The Flagellation of Christ is a panel painting by the Italian artist Cimabue, in egg tempera and gold leaf on a poplar panel, dated to c. 1280. It has been held by the Frick Collection in New York since 1950, and is the only painting by Cimabue in the United States. The Frick Collection acquired the painting from the Knoedler gallery in Paris in 1950. Previously, it had been owned by the antiques dealer M. Rolla at the end of the 19th century, inherited by G. Rolla, and then sold to the art dealer Eduardo Moratilla.

The painting depicts the flagellation of Christ, an episode in the Passion. In the painting, Christ, naked but for a loincloth, is bound to a marble column that rises up the centre of the scene, dividing it into two halves. He is being flogged by two figures, one to either side, in clothing of jarringly cheerful colours. The anguished Christ regards the viewer calmly. Tall city buildings in the background are depicted with Byzantine reverse perspective frame the scene. The figure of Christ is heavily influenced by that in Cimabue's Santa Croce Crucifix, while the torturers in bright clothing recall the Sienese School and the stylised background buildings the Roman school, the latter influence already taken on by Cimabue's workshop in the Lives of the Apostles in the Upper Basilica at Assisi.

The panel measures 24.7 cm × 20 cm (9.7 in × 7.9 in). It is one of three known panels from the Diptych of Devotion, an altarpiece which probably had two wings each with four panels, eight in all. The physical condition of the paint at the edges of the Flagellation of Christ panel indicate that it was at the lower-right corner of a larger composite work. Two other scenes by Cimabue, painted on wood panels of similar size, have been identified as parts of the same altarpiece: the Virgin and Child with Two Angels in the National Gallery in London (discovered in 2000) and The Mocking of Christ in the Louvre (discovered in 2019).

Attribution of the work has been problematic since it came to the attention of art historians in the 1950s. It was initially attributed it to the Sienese artist Duccio, but others suggested Cimabue or his workshop. The uncertainty was resolved after the discovery and attribution of the similarly sized Virgin and Child with Two Angels, definitively attributed to Cimabue, which led to a reattribution of the Flagellation of Christ from Duccio to Cimabue. The two panels were exhibited together in Pisa and London in 2005, and at the Frick Collection in 2006.

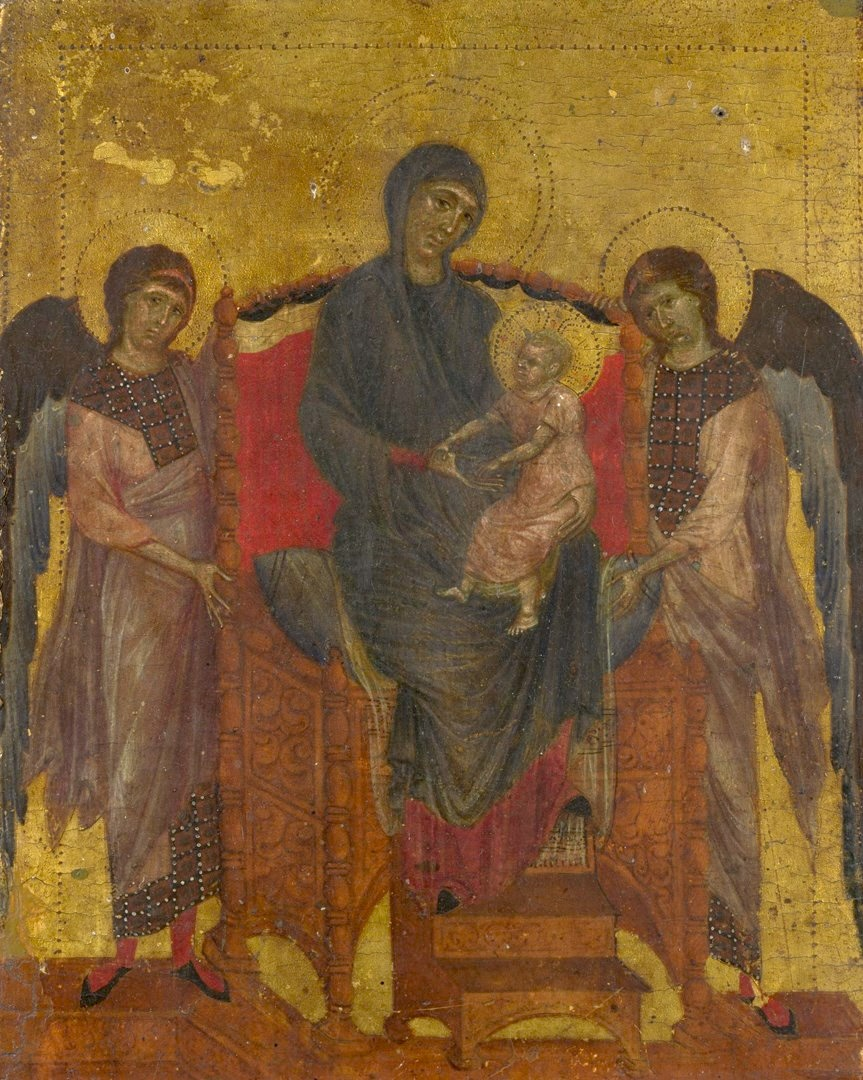
Cimabue, Virgin and Child with Two Angels, National Gallery

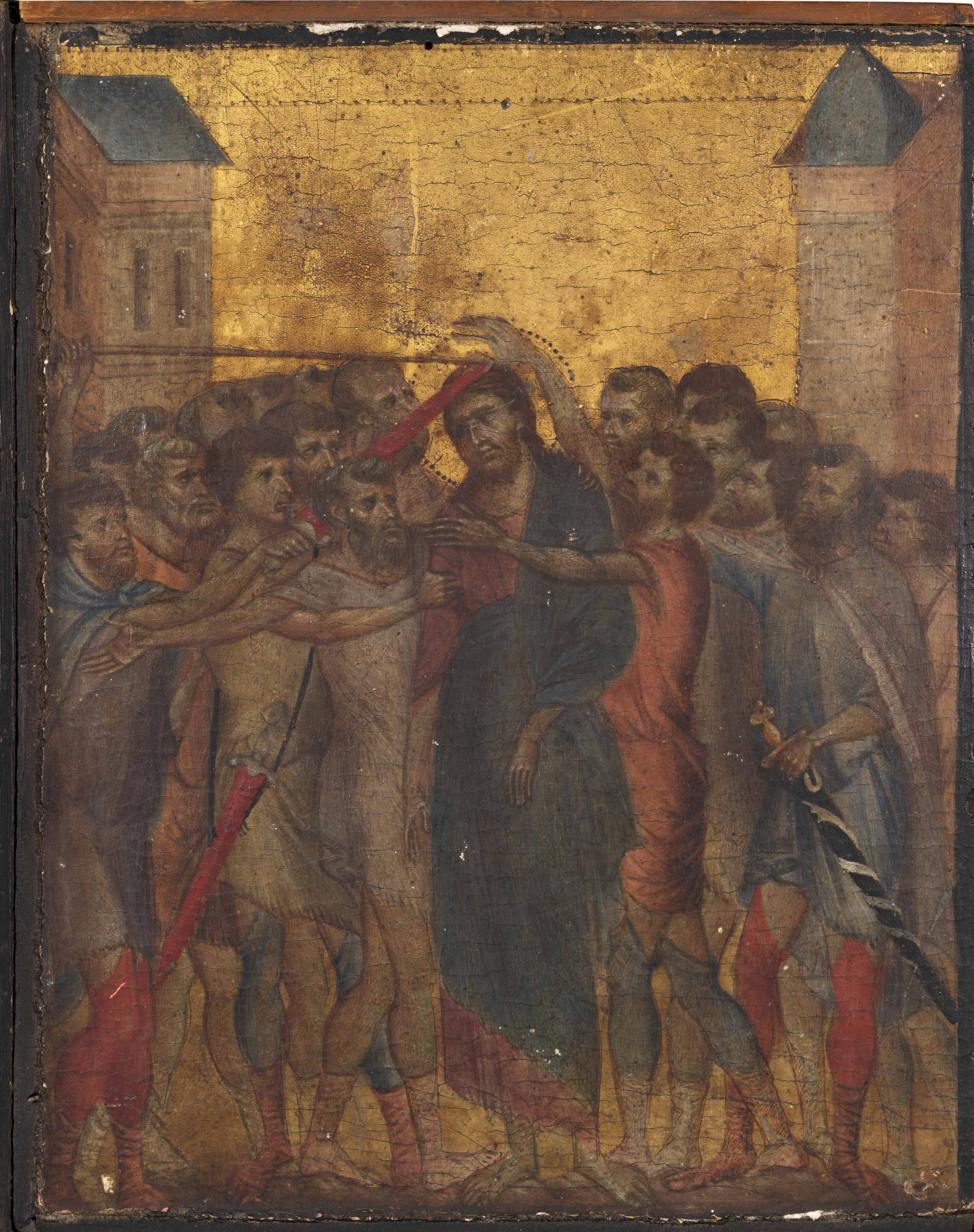
Cimabue, The Mocking of Christ, Louvre

A proposed reconstruction of the Diptych of Devotion
