= Virgin and Child with Two Angels (Cimabue) =

Painting by Cimabue

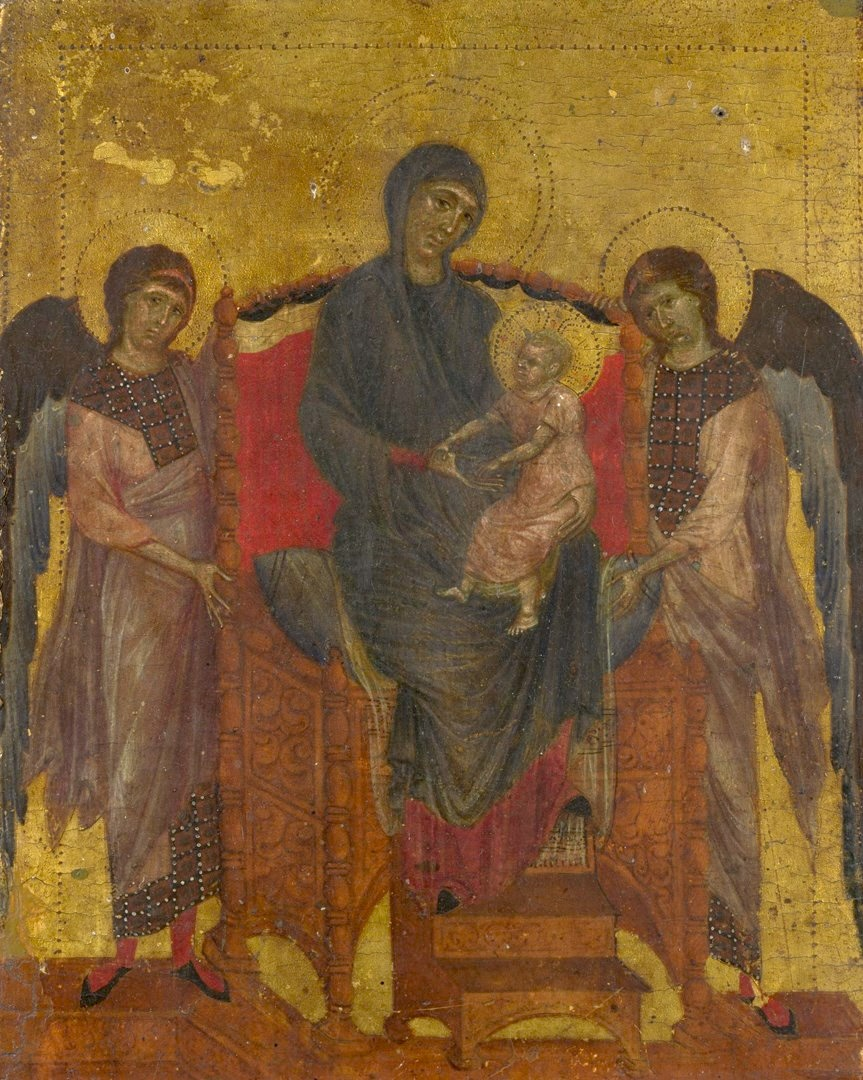
- Artist: Cimabue
- Year: c. 1280
- Medium: Tempera and gold leaf on poplar panel
- Dimensions: 25.6 cm × 20.8 cm (10.1 in × 8.2 in)
- Location: National Gallery, London

The Virgin and Child with Two Angels is a panel painting by the Italian artist Cimabue in egg tempera on a poplar panel, dated to c. 1280. It has been held by the National Gallery in London since 2000.

The painting measures 25.6 cm × 20.8 cm (10.1 in × 8.2 in). It depicts the Virgin and Child seated together on a throne, accompanied by two angels with long feathered wings. The composition is based on Byzantine models, but modified for a Western European audience: the throne has become three-dimensional, and the figures of the Virgin and Child are more human and less stylised than similar traditional Byzantine icons such as the Hodegetria.

The panel was rediscovered at Benacre Hall near Lowestoft in Suffolk in 2000, after the death of Sir John Gooch, 12th Baronet, as the contents of the house were being prepared for an auction sale. It may have been acquired in Florence in the early 19th century by his ancestor, Sir Edward Gooch, 6th Baronet, and survived a fire at the house in the 1920s.

It is one of three known panels from a polyptych depicting the Passion of Christ. From its physical characteristics, it was the top left of four panels on the left leaf of a diptych, and it quickly became apparent from its size, style and method that it was almost identical to a panel held by the Frick Collection in New York since 1950, The Flagellation of Christ. The discovery of this panel encouraged a change in the attribution of the Frick panel from Duccio to Cimabue. A third panel, The Mocking of Christ, was found in France in 2019, and auctioned for 24 million euros.

The panel was put up for sale and was expected to sell for £10 million, but before it was sold it was accepted in lieu of inheritance tax and allocated to the National Gallery. The heirs were granted a £6.5 million tax exemption, and a donation from Sir John Paul Getty Jr. allowed the gallery to pay a further £700,000. The other contents of the hall were sold in May 2000 for £8.3 million, a record for a country house sale in the UK.

Cimabue, The Mocking of Christ, Louvre

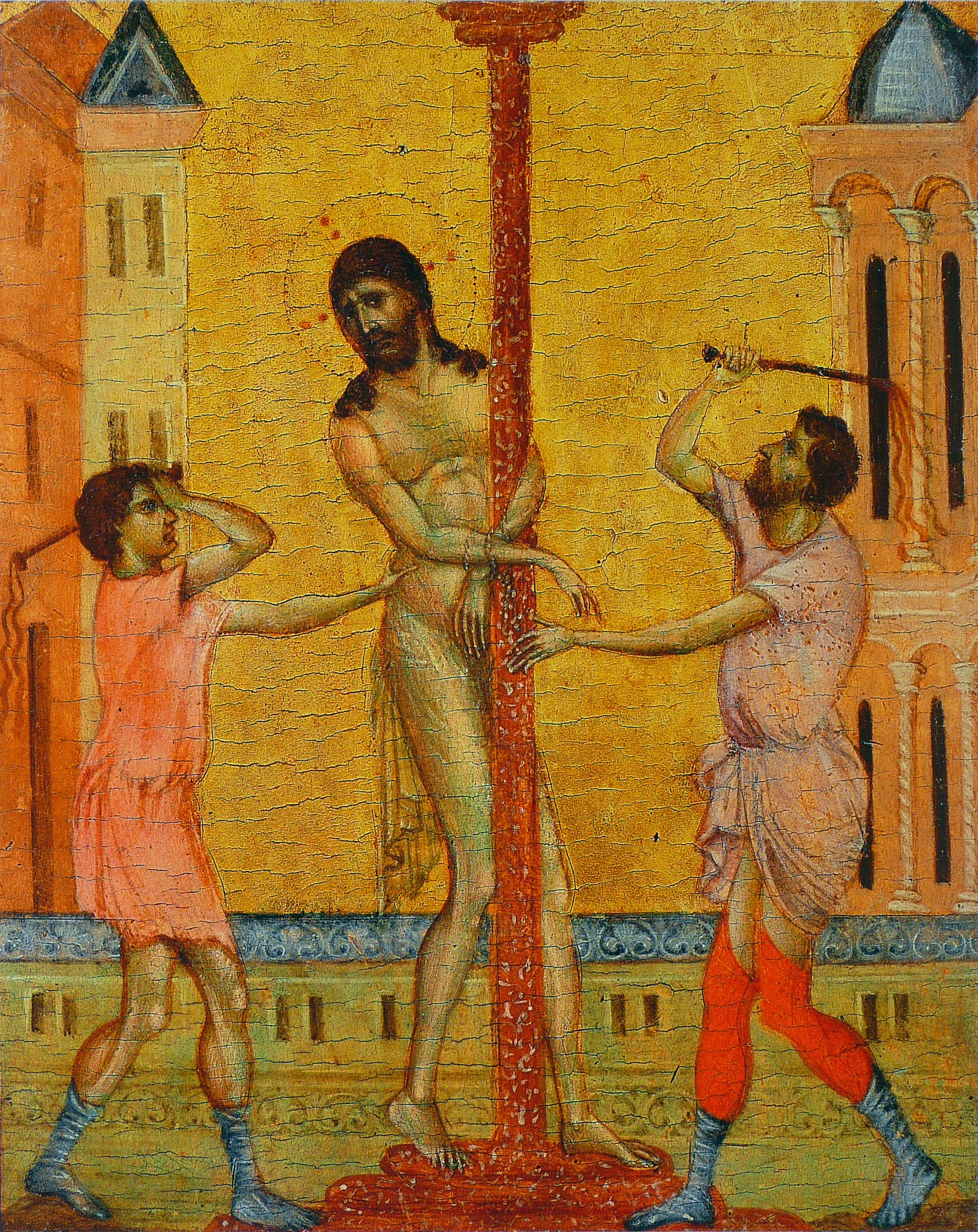
Cimabue, The Flagellation of Christ, Frick Collection

A proposed reconstruction of the Diptych of Devotion

== Sources ==
- The Virgin and Child with Two Angels, Cimabue, National Gallery
- A long-lost Cimabue has emerged – and the 'first light' of painting now burns brighter than ever, Donal Cooper, Apollo Magazine, 14 October 2019
- Forgotten masterpiece to 'fetch £2m', BBC News, 16 February 2000
- Small picture, big price tag, Maev Kennedy, The Guardian, 17 February 2000
- Sotheby's negotiate sale of Cimabue masterpiece to the nation, (PDF) Sotheby's, 29 June 2000
- Painting fetches £7m for family facing tax bill, Will Bennett, The Telegraph, 30 June 2000
- Inside art: London Museum Gets a Cimabue, Carol Vogel, New York Times, 30 June 2000
- Cimabue panel found hanging in kitchen to be auctioned in France estimated at €4m-6m, Alex Capon, Antiques Trade Gazette, 24 September 2019
- 13th century masterpiece found in French kitchen sells for record £20.7m, David Chazan, The Telegraph, 27 October 2019
