= Ruben Zimmermann =

German theologian and ethicist

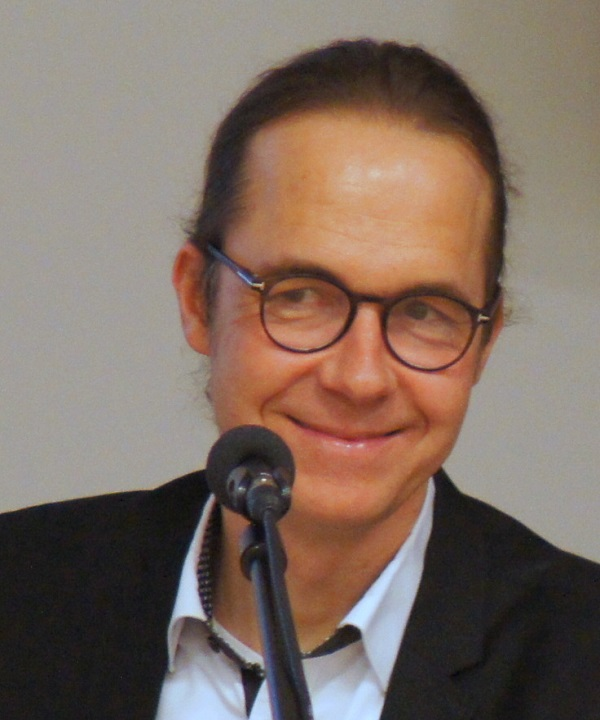
Ruben Zimmermann (2019)

Ruben Zimmermann (born May 10, 1968) is a German Theologian, New Testament Scholar and Ethicist, currently professor at the University of Mainz, Germany.

== Biography and education ==
Zimmermann received his PhD at Heidelberg University in 1999, and his Habilitation at LMU Munich in 2003. From 2005 to 2009, he was Professor for Biblical Studies at Bielefeld University; since then he is Professor at the Johannes Gutenberg-University of Mainz with research fields in New Testament Studies, Ethics and Hermeneutics.

He is Co-leader of the Mainz Research Center for Ethics in Antiquity and Christianity (e/ac), (Note: The centre for Ethics in Antiquity and Christianity was established in 2009 and provides a forum for scholars in the disciplines of Old Testament, New Testament, Church History/Patristics, and Systematic Theology/Ethics to engage in a focused exchange of ideas with researchers in other areas of antiquity (Jewish Studies, Classics, ancient Near Eastern studies, ancient philosophy, and ancient history) as well as in contemporary ethics and moral philosophy.) and he has been elected as one of 15 advanced career scholars in the Templeton "Enhancing Life Project".

Zimmermann is member of the Alexander von Humboldt-Foundation and was awarded with the Feodor-Lynen-Fellowship and with fundings as visiting scholar in Pretoria (University of Pretoria, 2008), Nijmegen (Radboud University, 2010), Melbourne (Australian Catholic University, 2016), New Haven (Yale University, Divinity School, 2024).

== Work – Research fields ==
His areas of research are in ethics (ethical theory, ethics of the Bible, applied ethics, e.g. bioethics and climate/earth ethics) the Gospel of John, the parables of Jesus, and miracle stories. Challenging scholarly consensus Zimmermann identifies also parables in the Gospel of John, such as the parable of the good shepherd (John 10:1-5) or the dying grain (John 12:24). In the Stone-Chaple-Podcast he talks about his approach on the parables of Jesus. See Stone-Chaple-Podcast Episode 190 and 191

== Books ==
=== As author ===
- Zimmermann, Ruben (2001). Geschlechtermetaphorik und Gottesverhältnis: Traditionsgeschichte und Theologie eines Bildfelds in Urchristentum und antiker Umwelt. WUNT. Vol. 122. Mohr Siebeck. ISBN 978-3-16-147374-6. ISSN 0512-1604.
- Zimmermann, Ruben (2004). Christologie der Bilder im Johannesevangelium: die Christopoetik des vierten Evangeliums unter besonderer Berücksichtigung von Joh 10. Mohr Siebeck. ISBN 978-3-16-148388-2.
- Zimmermann, Ruben (2015). Puzzling the Parables of Jesus: Methods and Interpretation. Fortress Press. ISBN 978-1-4514-6532-7.
- Zimmermann, Ruben (2016). Die Logik der Liebe: Die implizite Ethik der Paulusbriefe am Beispiel des 1. Korintherbriefs. Biblisch-Theologische Studien. Vol. 162. Vandenhoeck & Ruprecht. ISBN 978-3-7887-2994-3. English translation: Logic of Love: Discovering Paul's "implicit Ethics" Through 1 Corinthians, Lexington/Fortress Academic, 2018, see the review
- Zimmermann, Ruben (2023) Parabeln in der Bibel. Die Sinnwelten der Gleichnisse Jesu entdecken. Penguin, Random House, Gütersloher Verlagshaus, Gütersloh 2023, ISBN 978-3-579-08542-5.
- Zimmermann, Ruben (2025), Breaking New Ground in John. Imagery – Parables – Characters – Christology – Ethics, ed. by Dieter T. Roth, WUNT 531, Tübingen: Mohr Siebeck, ISBN.
- Zimmermann, Ruben (2025), Warum weniger gut sein kann. Eine Ethik des Verzichts, Was bedeutet das alles? RUB Nr. 14661, Stuttgart: Reclam 2025, 4th ed. 2025.
- Zimmermann, Ruben (2025), Wäre Jesus Klimaaktivist? Biblische Inspirationen für eine zeitgemäße Schöpfungsethik, Leipzig: Evangelische Verlagsanstalt, 2025, 2nd ed. 2025.
- Zimmermann, Ruben, Susanne Luther, and Dieter T. Roth, Die Kunst der Auslegung. Ein kompetenzorientiertes Methodenbuch für die hermeneutische Exegese des Neuen Testaments, Tübingen: Mohr Siebeck 2026.

=== As editor ===
- Zimmermann, Ruben (2000). Bildersprache verstehen: zur Hermeneutik der Metapher und anderer bildlicher Sprachformen. Übergänge. Vol. 38. Fink. ISBN 978-3-7705-3492-0.
- Zimmermann, Ruben; Rohls, Jan (2003). Metaphorik und Christologie. Theologische Bibliothek Töpelmann. Vol. 120. Walter de Gruyter. ISBN 978-3-11-017645-2.
- Zimmermann, Ruben; Frey, Jörg; Watt, Jan Gabriël Van der; Kern, Gabriele (2006). Imagery in the Gospel of John: Terms, Forms, Themes, and Theology of Johannine Figurative Language. WUNT. Vol. 200. Mohr Siebeck. ISBN 978-3-16-149116-0. ISSN 0512-1604.
- Zimmermann, Ruben; Dormeyer, Detlev (2007). Kompendium der Gleichnisse Jesu. Gütersloher Verlagshaus. ISBN 978-3-579-08020-8.
- Zimmermann, Ruben; Kern, Gabi (2008). Hermeneutik der Gleichnisse Jesu: Methodische Neuansätze zum Verstehen urchristlicher Parabeltexte. WUNT. Vol. 231. Mohr Siebeck. ISBN 978-3-16-150850-9. ISSN 0512-1604.
- Zimmermann, Ruben; Horn, Friedrich Wilhelm (2009). Kontexte und Normen neutestamentlicher Ethik 1: Jenseits von Indikativ und Imperativ. WUNT. Vol. 238. Mohr Siebeck. ISBN 978-3-16-149997-5. ISSN 0512-1604.
- Zimmermann, Ruben; Van der Watt, Jan Gabriël; Luther, Susanne (2010). Kontexte und Normen neutestamentlicher Ethik 2: Moral Language in the New Testament. WUNT. Vol. 290. Mohr Siebeck. ISBN 978-3-16-150354-2. ISSN 0512-1604.
- Zimmermann, Ruben; Van der Watt, Jan Gabriël (2012). Kontexte und Normen neutestamentlicher Ethik 3: Rethinking the Ethics of John: "implicit Ethics" in the Johannine Writings. WUNT. Vol. 291. Mohr Siebeck. ISBN 978-3-16-151830-0. ISSN 0512-1604.
- Zimmermann, Ruben (2013). Kompendium der frühchristlichen Wundererzählungen. Vol. 1. Gütersloher Verlagshaus. ISBN 978-3-579-08120-5.
- Zimmermann, Ruben; Horn, Friedrich Wilhelm; Volp, Ulrich; Verwold, Esther (2013). Kontexte und Normen neutestamentlicher Ethik 4: Ethische Normen des frühen Christentums: Gut – Leben – Leib – Tugend. WUNT. Vol. 313. Mohr Siebeck. ISBN 978-3-16-152499-8. ISSN 0512-1604.
- Zimmermann; Zimmermann, Mirjam (2013). Handbuch Bibeldidaktik. UTB. Vol. 3996. Mohr Siebeck. ISBN 978-3-8252-3996-1.
- Zimmermann, Ruben; Hunt, Steven A; Tolmie, D. Francois (2013). Character Studies in the Fourth Gospel: Narrative Approaches to Seventy Figures in John. WUNT. Vol. 314. Mohr Siebeck. ISBN 978-3-16-152784-5. ISSN 0512-1604.
- Zimmermann, Ruben; Roth, Dieter T.; Labahn, Michael (2014). Metaphor, Narrative, and Parables in Q. WUNT. Vol. 315. Mohr Siebeck. ISBN 978-3-16-152338-0. ISSN 0512-1604.
- Zimmermann, Ruben; Luther, Susanne (2014). Studienbuch Hermeneutik: Bibelauslegung durch die Jahrhunderte als Lernfeld der Textinterpretation : Portraits – Modelle – Quellentexte. Gütersloher Verlagshaus. ISBN 978-3-579-08137-3.
- Zimmermann, Ruben; Horn, Friedrich W.; Volp, Ulrich (2016). Kontexte und Normen neutestamentlicher Ethik 7: Metapher – Narratio – Mimesis – Doxologie: Begründungsformen frühchristlicher und antiker Ethik. WUNT. Vol. 356. Mohr Siebeck. ISBN 978-3-16-154051-6. ISSN 0512-1604.
- Faszination der Wunder Jesu und der Apostel. Die Debatte um die frühchristlichen Wundererzählungen geht weiter (BThS 184), Göttingen: Vandenhoeck & Ruprecht 2020. siehe Verlagsseite
- Zimmermann, Ruben, and Dogara I. Manomi (eds. 2022), “Ready for Every Good Work” (Titus 3:1): Implicit Ethics in the Letter to Titus, Contexts and Norms of New Testament Ethics Volume XIII, WUNT 484, Tübingen: Mohr Siebeck .
- Zimmermann, Ruben et al. (eds., 2024), Ethik der Zeit - Zeiten der Ethik. Ethische Temporalität in Antike und Christentum. WUNT 510, Mohr Siebeck, Tübingen 2024, ISBN 978-3-16-160721-9, see Ruben Zimmermann: Knappe Zeit zum Handeln. Das μικρὸν χρόνον-Motiv im Johannesevangelium in schöpfungsethischer Perspektive, pages 229–246.
- Shoukry, Zacharias, Mirjam Jekel, and Ruben Zimmermann (eds., 2025), Creation Concepts and Creation Care in Early Judaism, Early Christianity, and Beyond. Contexts and Norms of New Testament Ethics Vol. XVII, WUNT 537, Tübingen: Mohr Siebeck.
- Strong, Justin D. and Ruben Zimmermann (eds., 2025), The Animal in the New Testament. Perspectives from Animal Studies and Ancient Discourse, LNTS 701, London: Bloomsbury/T&T Clark.
