= Narrative criticism =

Narrative criticism focuses on the stories a speaker or a writer tells to understand how they help us make meaning out of our daily human experiences. Narrative theory is a means by which we can comprehend how we impose order on our experiences and actions by giving them a narrative form. According to Walter Fisher, narratives are fundamental to communication and provide structure for human experience and influence people to share common explanations and understandings. Fisher defines narratives as "symbolic actions-words and/or deeds that have sequence and meaning for those who live, create, or interpret them." Study of narrative criticism, therefore, includes form (fiction or non-fiction, prose or poetry), genre (myth, history, legend, etc.), structure (including plot, theme, irony, foreshadowing, etc.) characterization, and communicator's perspective.

== Characteristics of narrative criticism ==
Characteristics of a narrative were defined as early as Aristotle in his Poetics under plot. He called plot as the "first principle" or the "soul of a tragedy." According to him, plot is the arrangement of incidents that imitate the action with a beginning, middle, and end. Plot includes introduction of characters, rising action and introduction of complication, development of complication, climax (narrative), and final resolution. As described by White (1981) and Martin (1986), plot involves a structure of action. However, not all narratives contain a plot. Fragmentation occurs as the traditional plot disappears, narratives become less linear, and the burden of meaning making gets shifted from the narrator to the reader.

Narratives can be found in a range of practices such as novels, short stories, plays, films, histories, documentaries, gossip, biographies, television and scholarly books. All of these artifacts make excellent objects for narrative criticism. When performing a narrative criticism, critics should focus on the features of the narrative that allow them to say something meaningful about the artifact. Sample questions from Sonja K Foss offer a guide for analysis:

- Setting – How does the setting relate to the plot and characters? How is the particular setting created? Is the setting textually prominent – highly developed and detailed – or negligible?
- Characters (Persona) – Are some of the characters non-human or inanimate phenomena, described as thinking and speaking beings? In what actions do the characters engage? Are the characters round (possess a variety of traits, some of them conflicting or contradictory) or flat (one or a few dominant traits making the character predictable)?
- Narrator – Is the narrative presented directly to the audience, or is it mediated by a narrator? What makes the narrator intrusive or not? What kind of person is the narrator (examine his or her ethos)?
- Events – What are the major and minor events? How are the events presented? Are the events active (expressing action) or stative (expressing a state or condition)?
- Temporal relations – Do events occur in a brief period of time or over many years? What is the relationship between the natural order of the events as they occurred and the order of their presentation in the telling of a narrative? Is the story in past or present tense?
- Causal relations – What cause-and-effect relationships are established in the narrative? Are events caused largely by human action, accident, or forces of nature? In how much detail are the causes and effects described?
- Audience – Is the audience a participant in the events recounted? What can be inferred about the audience's attitudes, knowledge, or situation from the narrative? What seems to be the narrator's evaluation of the audience's knowledge, personality, and abilities?
- Theme – What is the major theme (general idea illustrated by the narrative) of the narrative? How is the theme articulated? How obvious and clear is the theme?
- Limitations: Traditional narrative criticism focuses primarily on the narrative and does not take the socioeconomic and political background into consideration; however, it is not opposed to New Historicism theory. In addition, it does not take the narrator's motivations into consideration as it focuses on the narrative to generate the analysis. Also, as the critic looks at the overall unity of the narrative, the theory is not conducive to deconstruction techniques (19-20).

== New Testament narrative criticism ==
David Rhoads introduced the term "narrative criticism" in 1982 to describe a new literary approach to the New Testament gospels.

The first book-length treatment of a gospel from a narrative-critical perspective is Mark as Story. Rhoads and Michie analyzed the Gospel of Mark in terms of the role of the narrator, literary devices, settings (cosmic, political-cultural, and physical), plot, characters and characterization, and audience. On the heels of Rhoads and Michie, R. Alan Culpepper published the first book-length treatment of the Gospel of John from a narrative-critical perspective. Culpepper developed the role of the narrator and point of view in the narrative, the role of narrative time, plot, characters, literary devices such as misunderstanding and symbolism, and the role of the implied reader. Following these two seminal studies on Mark and John in the 1980s, several hundred narrative-critical and narratological studies have been published on the gospels, Acts, and the Book of Revelation.
