= Mocking of Jesus =

Biblical event in the New Testament

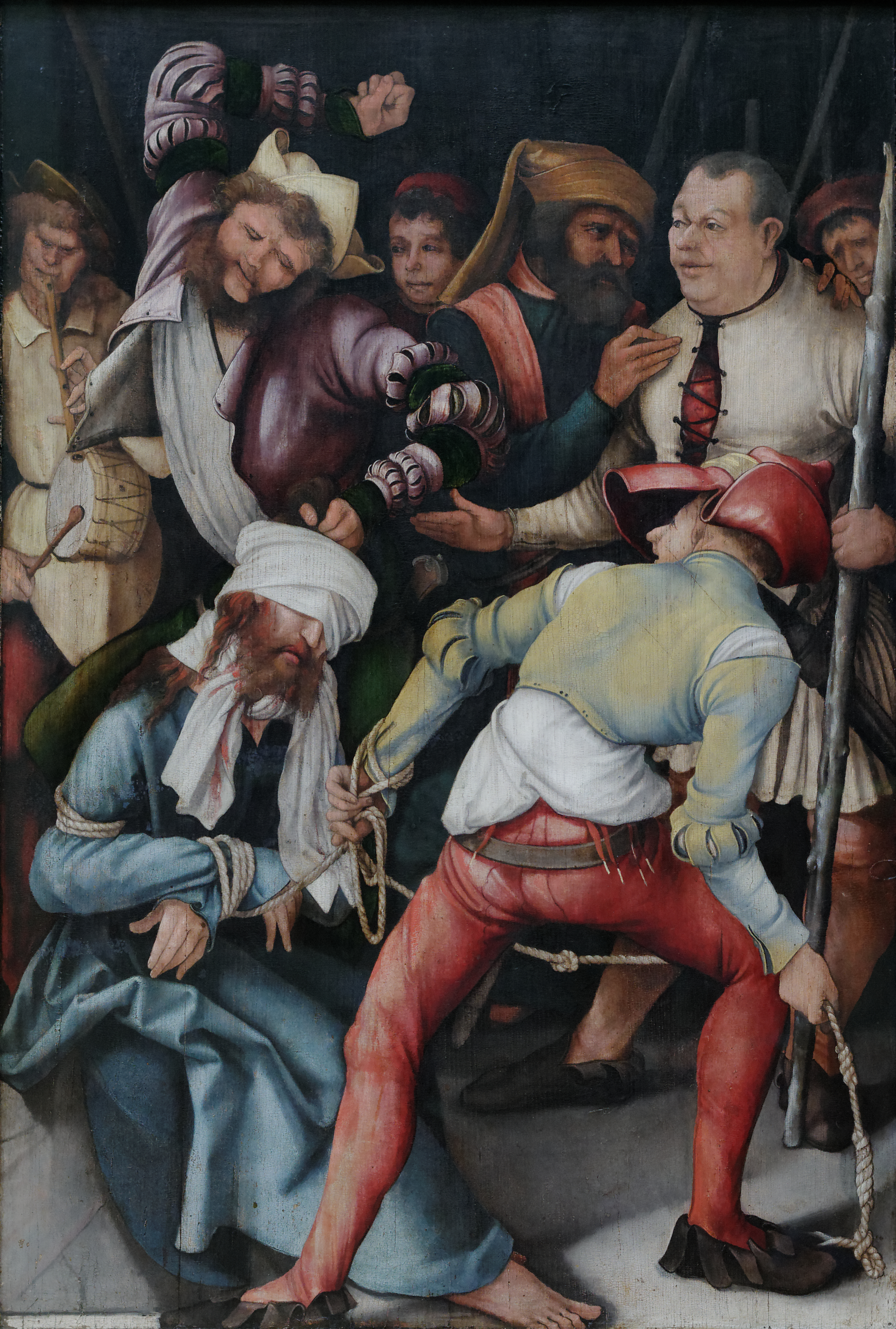
Mocking of Christ by Matthias Grünewald, c. 1505

The mocking of Jesus occurred several times, after his trial and before his crucifixion according to the canonical gospels of the New Testament. It is considered part of the passion of Jesus.

According to the gospel narratives, Jesus had predicted that he would be mocked (Matthew 20:19, Mark 10:34, and Luke 18:32). The mocking of Christ took place in three stages: immediately following his trial, immediately following his condemnation by Pontius Pilate, and when he was being crucified.

The New Testament narratives of Jesus being mocked are filled with irony, while the mockery focuses on the prophetic and kingly roles of Jesus.

== First stage ==
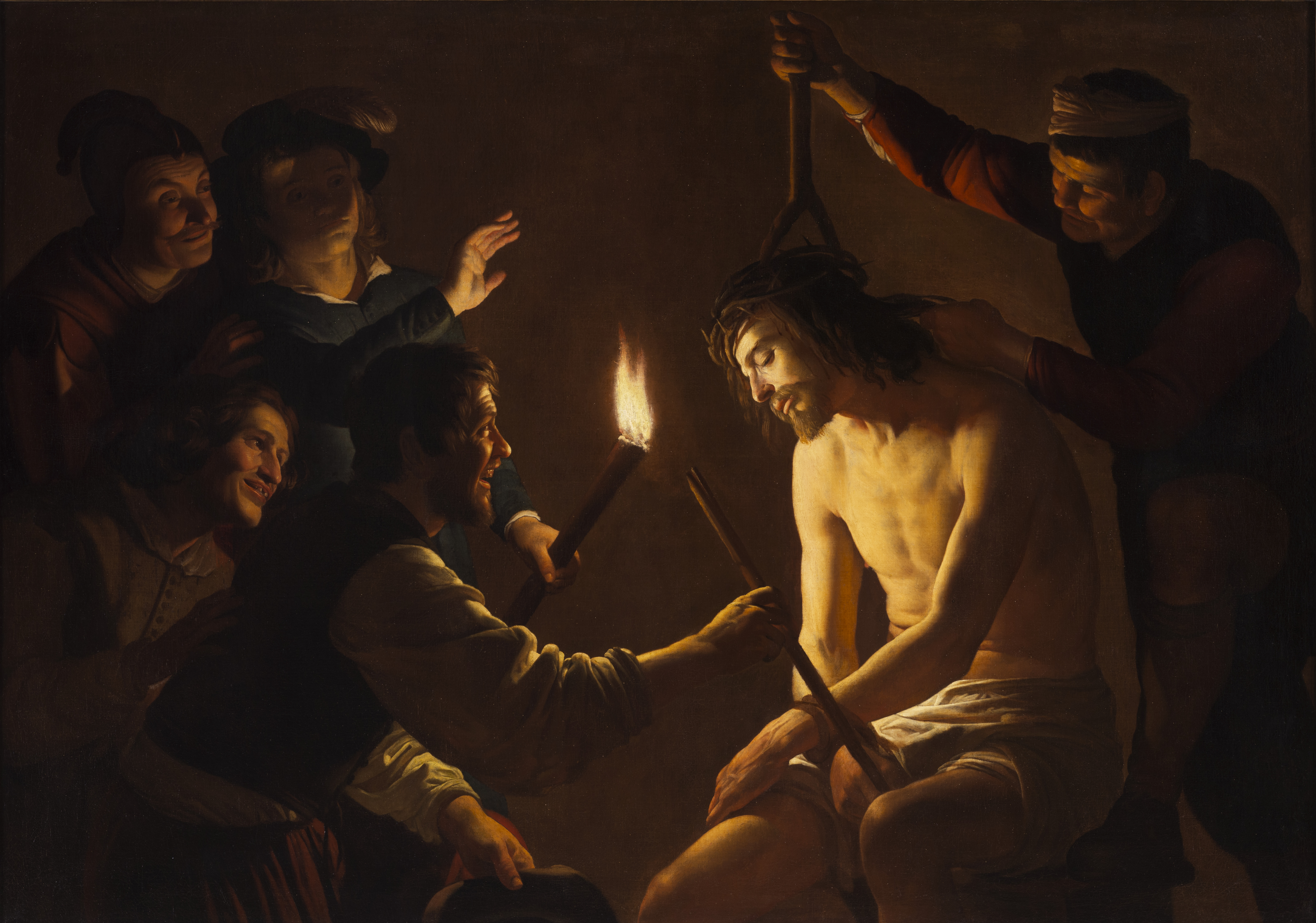
Gerrit van Honthorst, Mocking of Christ, c. 1617

After the condemnation of Jesus by the Sanhedrin, some spat on him (Mark 14:65). He was blindfolded and beaten, and then mocked: "Prophesy! Who hit you?" (Luke 22:63). This was done by those men who "held Jesus" (Luke 22:63, King James Version). The New International Version translates this as "the men who were guarding Jesus", but Joel B. Green takes the phrase to refer to the "Chief priests, the officers of the temple police, and the elders" mentioned in verse 52.

Green suggests that Jesus suffers the mockery that is typical of prophets, and that his suffering suggests his "solidarity with God's agents who speak on God's behalf and are rejected." Susan R. Garrett sees Mark's inclusion of the mockery as an example of irony, since Jesus is indeed a prophet, at the very moment his prophecy that Peter would deny him was being fulfilled. The prophetic assignment is not always portrayed as positive in the Bible, and prophets were often the target of persecution and opposition.

== Second stage ==
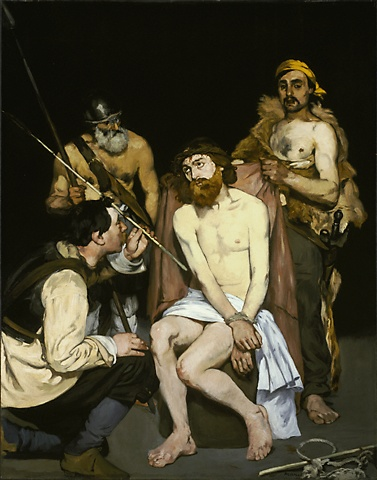
Édouard Manet, Jesus Mocked by the Soldiers, c. 1865

After his condemnation by Pontius Pilate, Jesus was flogged and mocked by Roman soldiers. They clothed him with a "purple" (Mark 15:17) or "scarlet" (Matthew 27:28) robe symbolizing a royal gown since purple was a royal color, put a crown of thorns on his head symbolizing a royal crown, and put a staff in his hand symbolizing a scepter. They knelt before him and said, "Hail, king of the Jews!" (Matthew 27:29). This was done as a mockery of Jesus's kingship. After this, they spat on him, and struck him on the head with the staff repeatedly.

Peter Leithart notes that at the end of the scene, the soldiers "reverse the whole coronation with an anti-coronation. They spit in contempt instead of kneeling in reverence, pull the scepter from Jesus's hand and beat His crowned head with it, strip off the scarlet robe and replace it with Jesus's own robe." Leithart goes on to suggest that, at this point, the Romans "remove the veil of irony and reveal what they really think" about the Jews and their God.

Robert J. Miller suggests that the gospel account is deeply ironic since Jesus is exercising his kingship through submission and suffering: "the Roman legionnaires have unwittingly furthered God's secret purposes by dressing Jesus up as a king." In fact, the irony operates on two levels. James L. Resseguie points out that there is verbal irony in the way the soldiers "mock Jesus as a dismal failure and a pretend king" (that is, the soldiers are themselves being ironic) as well as dramatic irony in that the readers "know that the acclamation rings true in ways that the soldiers could not possibly understand."

Luke 23:11 also mentions that "Herod and his soldiers ridiculed and mocked him" (New Revised Standard Version).

== Third stage ==
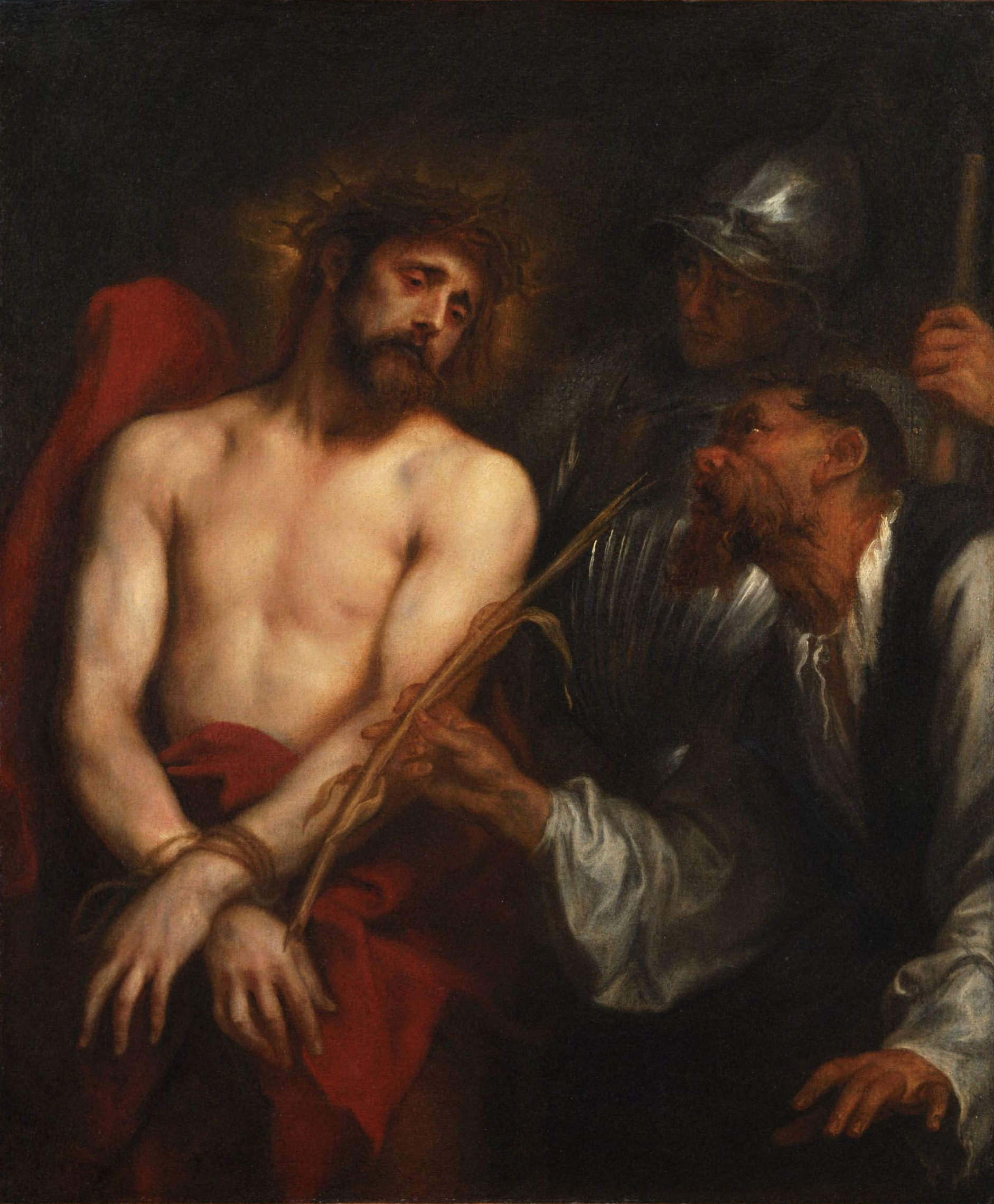
Anthony van Dyck, The Mocking of Christ, c. 1629

Jesus was also mocked while he was on the cross. According to Mark 15:29–30, this was done by those who passed by and hurled insults at him and told him to come down from the cross. Mark 15:31–32 points out that "the chief priests and the teachers of the law" also mocked him among themselves, saying: "He saved others, but he can't save himself! Let this Messiah, this king of Israel, come down now from the cross, that we may see and believe." Finally, those crucified with Jesus also heaped insults at him (Mark 15:32).

Luke 23:36–37 mentions mocking by Roman soldiers: "The soldiers also mocked him, coming up and offering him sour wine, and saying, 'If you are the King of the Jews, save yourself!'" (New Revised Standard Version). In Matthew 27:42 people, priest and the elders mock Jesus, and shout at him while he is hanging on the cross: "He saved others; let Him save Himself if He is the Christ, the chosen of God."

According to Luke 23:39, one criminal on his left who hung there together with Jesus on the cross, hurled insults at Jesus: "Aren't you the Messiah? Save yourself and us!"

Thus, whereas the first stage involves mockery by Jews, and the second stage mockery by gentiles, the third stage has both together. Leithart notes that at this point "Jews and Gentiles, governors and criminals, scribes and commoners, all humanity joins in a single chorus of blasphemy."

Timothy C. Gray notes that in the Gospel of Mark, the mocking of Jesus on the cross "takes up the two charges leveled against Jesus at his trial": firstly, that Jesus "threatened the temple with destruction" (14:58 and 15:29); secondly, that Jesus "claimed to be the Messiah" (14:61–62 and 15:31–32).

== Theological significance ==
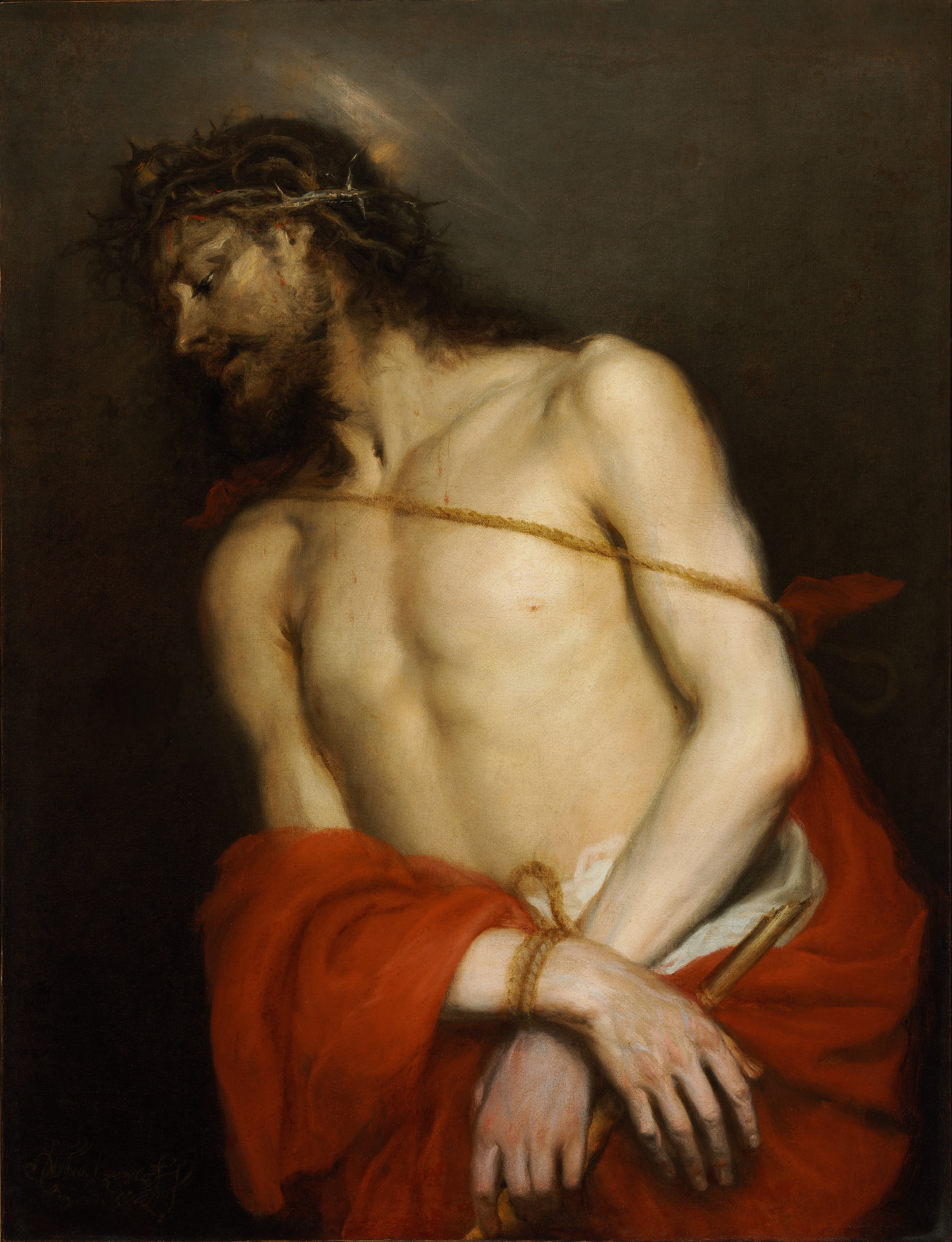
Mateo Cerezo, Ecce Homo, 1650

Peter Leithart argues that in the person of Jesus, God himself was mocked. He suggests that "for Matthew, the cross is mainly about man's mockery of God," and notes that while Paul says in Galatians 6:7 that "God is not mocked", this is precisely because God has been mocked.

Many Christians see the suffering of Jesus as being redemptive. Francis Foulkes argues that the emphasis in the New Testament is on Jesus's suffering and death being "for us". In this way, some Christians see the mockery that Jesus endured as being borne on their behalf. For example, Philip Bliss wrote in his hymn, "Hallelujah! What a Savior":

Bearing shame and scoffing rude,
In my place condemned He stood;
Sealed my pardon with His blood.
Hallelujah! What a Savior!

The mockery of Jesus is also seen by many Christians in the servant songs, such as in Isaiah 50:6, where:

I gave my back to those who strike,
and my cheeks to those who pull out the beard;
I hid not my face from disgrace and spitting.

— Isaiah 50:6<red>Isaiah 50:6</ref>

Which is in remarkable contrast with the forward looking following verse, Isaiah 50:7:

Because the Sovereign Lord helps me,
I will not be disgraced.
Therefore have I set my face like flint,
and I know I will not be put to shame.

— Isaiah 50:7

The scene when Jesus was mocked while he was on the cross, is also a manifestation of the mercy of God through Jesus, who himself is mocked, humiliated and in pain. Two men were crucified at the same time as Jesus, one on his right hand and one on his left (Matthew 27:38, Mark 15:27–28, 32 Luke 23:33, John 19:18), which the Gospel of Mark interprets as fulfillment of the prophecy of Isaiah 53:12 According to both the Gospel of Matthew and Mark, respectively, both of the "thieves" mocked Jesus (Matthew 27:44, Mark 15:32); Luke however, mentions that:

Now one of the criminals hanging there reviled Jesus, saying, "Are you not the Messiah? Save yourself and us." The other, however, rebuking him, said in reply, "Have you no fear of God, for you are subject to the same condemnation? And indeed, we have been condemned justly, for the sentence we received corresponds to our crimes, but this man has done nothing criminal." Then he said, "Jesus, remember me when you come into your kingdom." He replied to him, "Amen I say to you today you will be with me in Paradise."

— Luke 23:39–43, New International Version

Jesus promised to the Penitent thief that he would be with him in the Paradise, right in front of those who were mocking him. God saves through Jesus, because God is full of mercy, a mercy revealed through Jesus Christ, who says to a thief: "Today you will be with me in Paradise."

== See also ==
- Flagellation of Christ
- Crown of thorns
- Ecce homo

== Bibliography ==
- Pejović, Roksanda (1993). "The Mocking of Christ and other scenes from the cycle of The sufferings of Christ as illustrated by musical instruments in southern-European art". New Sound (2): 71–93. ISSN 0354-818X.
- Ballester, Jordi (2018). "Trumpets, Heralds and Minstrels: Their relation to the Image of Power and Representation in the Fourteenth- and Fifteenth-Century Catalano-Aragonese Painting". Music in Art. 43 (1–2): 5–19. ISSN 1522-7464.
