= The Mocking of Christ (van Dyck) =

Painting by Anthony van Dyck

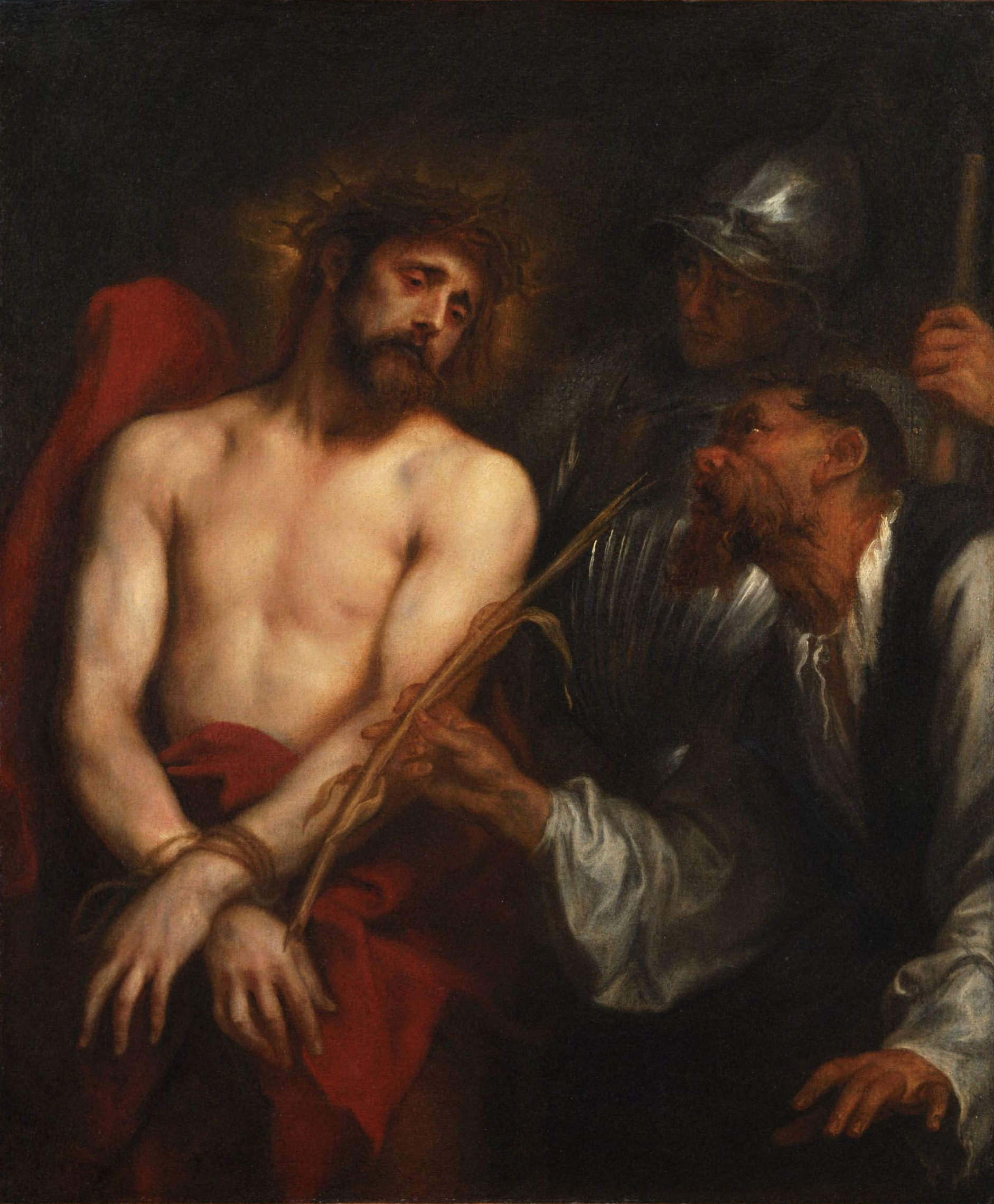
- Artist: Anthony van Dyck
- Year: 1628–1630
- Medium: oil on canvas
- Dimensions: 111 cm × 93 cm (44 in × 37 in)
- Location: Museo del Prado, Madrid

The Mocking of Christ is an oil-on-canvas painting by the Flemish painter Anthony van Dyck (1599–1641) held in the Princeton University Art Museum. The work was executed some time in the period from 1628 to 1630, when the influence of Rubens' Baroque style on van Dyck was tempered by the style of Titian whose work van Dyck had studied firsthand in Italy.

== Description ==
The painting depicts a scene from the story of the passion of Christ as described in Matthew 27 verses 27-29. Christ is depicted after having been stripped of his clothes and having a crown of thorns placed on his head. He is red-eyed as a result of the torture he has suffered and his head is hanging to the left. There are two tormentors on his left one of whom is busy placing a reed between Christ's bound hands. According to Matthew 27:29 the reed was a mocking representation of a royal scepter as the accusations made against Christ included that he had claimed to be a king.

The second military figure standing in the shadows behind the first one is holding a staff in one hand while placing a scarlet mantel on Christ's shoulders with the other. The staff shows he is not a common soldier but a Roman commander. While staring intently at Christ's face, this man's expression appears to indicate that he has suddenly become aware of the divine nature of the person he is tormenting. Van Dyck likely intends to evoke through this commander the experience of another character in the Gospels, the centurion Longinus, who while looking up to the dead Christ on the cross uttered the words, "Truly, this man was the Son of God." A person similar to the Roman commander appears in some Gospel paintings of Rubens.
