= Beda College =

College in Rome, Italy

Coordinates: 41°51′28″N 12°28′25″E

Pontifical Beda College
- Latin: Collegium S. Beda de Urbe
- Former names: Collegio Ecclesiastico; Collegio Pio
- Motto: Christo spectante curramus
- Type: Seminary
- Established: 1852; 174 years ago
- Founder: Pope Pius IX
- Religious affiliation: Roman Catholic
- Rector: Canon Marcus Holden
- Location: Rome, Italy
- Website: https://bedacollege.org/

The Pontifical Beda College (Italian: Pontificio Collegio Beda) is a Catholic seminary in Rome. It was founded as the Collegio Ecclesiastico at the Palazzo dei Convertendi in 1852 by Pope Pius IX and was established to train older men, often convert clergymen, wishing to prepare for the priesthood. Its students now include older Catholic men "drawn to the priesthood later in life" and ordained post-graduate degree students.

== History ==
This college was moved in 1854 to the English College to accommodate a larger number of clergymen from England who had joined the Roman Catholic Church from other Christian denominations and wished to prepare for the Catholic priesthood. They came for only four years, because they were seen to have significant experience already. Here the college became known as the Collegio Pio. It also included lifelong Catholics drawn to the priesthood later in life, and priests studying for post-graduate degrees in Rome. Pope Leo XIII issued a new constitution in 1898 and placed the college under the patronage of Bede, the eighth-century Anglo-Saxon monk and scholar. Edward Henry Howard bequeathed to the two colleges his library.

It was decided by the Sacred Congregation of Studies (1917), that it should be completely separated from the Venerable English College, and that it should have a corporate life entirely of its own under a rector and staff of its own and in its own premises. Pending the acquisition of a permanent home, temporary premises were rented in the Prati di Castello from the Polish Hospice. Horace Kinder Mann was brought from England to be the new rector, and J. C. Richards was appointed vice-rector. The Bede students took up their new quarters on 2 January 1918.

When the First World War ended, the Polish returned to Rome and the Beda became homeless. The community was transferred in 1922 to the Via S. Niccolo da Tolentino close by the Piazza Barberini. The college made progress under the guidance of Mann and his vice-rector McShane.

In 1956, Pope Pius XII provided from the extraterritorial property of the Holy See the land on which the present Beda stands, adjacent to the Basilica of Saint Paul Outside the Walls. Pope John XXIII formally opened the new building on 20 October 1960.

The Beda remains the responsibility of the Bishops of England and Wales, but it now receives men from English-speaking countries worldwide.

With plans to relocate the Scots College, it was announced in May 2023 that students of the Scots College would move to Beda College in September 2023, until a permanent location is found.

== Notable students ==
- Benedict Williamson, (1868–1948) English architect and priest
- Father Thomas Byles (1870–1912), English Catholic priest and passenger of RMS Titanic
- J. G. Greig (1871–1958), English cricketer, soldier and Catholic priest
- Richard Downey (1881–1953), Archbishop of Liverpool
- Alfred Newman Gilbey (1901–1998), Chaplain to Cambridge University
- Geoffrey Davey (1906–1975), Australian civil engineer and priest
- Gordon Wheeler (1910–1998), Bishop of Leeds
- Walton Hannah (1910–1966)
- Richard Gagnon (born 1948), Archbishop of Winnipeg
- Patrick van der Vorst (born 1971), Belgian-British priest and former art expert and auctioneer.

== List of rectors ==
- Louis B. English, 1852–64
- Neve, 1864–67
- Henry O'Callaghan, 1867–97

1897–1908: Giles [Vice-Rector] 1908–1911: Joseph Butt [Vice-Rector] 1911–1917: Thomas George [Vice-Rector]

- Horace Kinder Mann, 1918–28
- Charles Duchemin, 1928–61
- Jeremiah John Curtin, 1961–72
- Brendan Travers, 1972–78
- William Mitchell, 1978–87
- Walter Drumm, 1987–91
- Peter Walton, 1991–92
- Brian Dazeley, 1992–98
- Roderick Strange, 1998–2015
- Philip Gillespie, 2015–25
- Marcus Holden, 2025–present
