= Mark Langham =

British priest (1960–2021)

The Reverend Monsignor Mark Langham
- Catholic Chaplain to the University of Cambridge
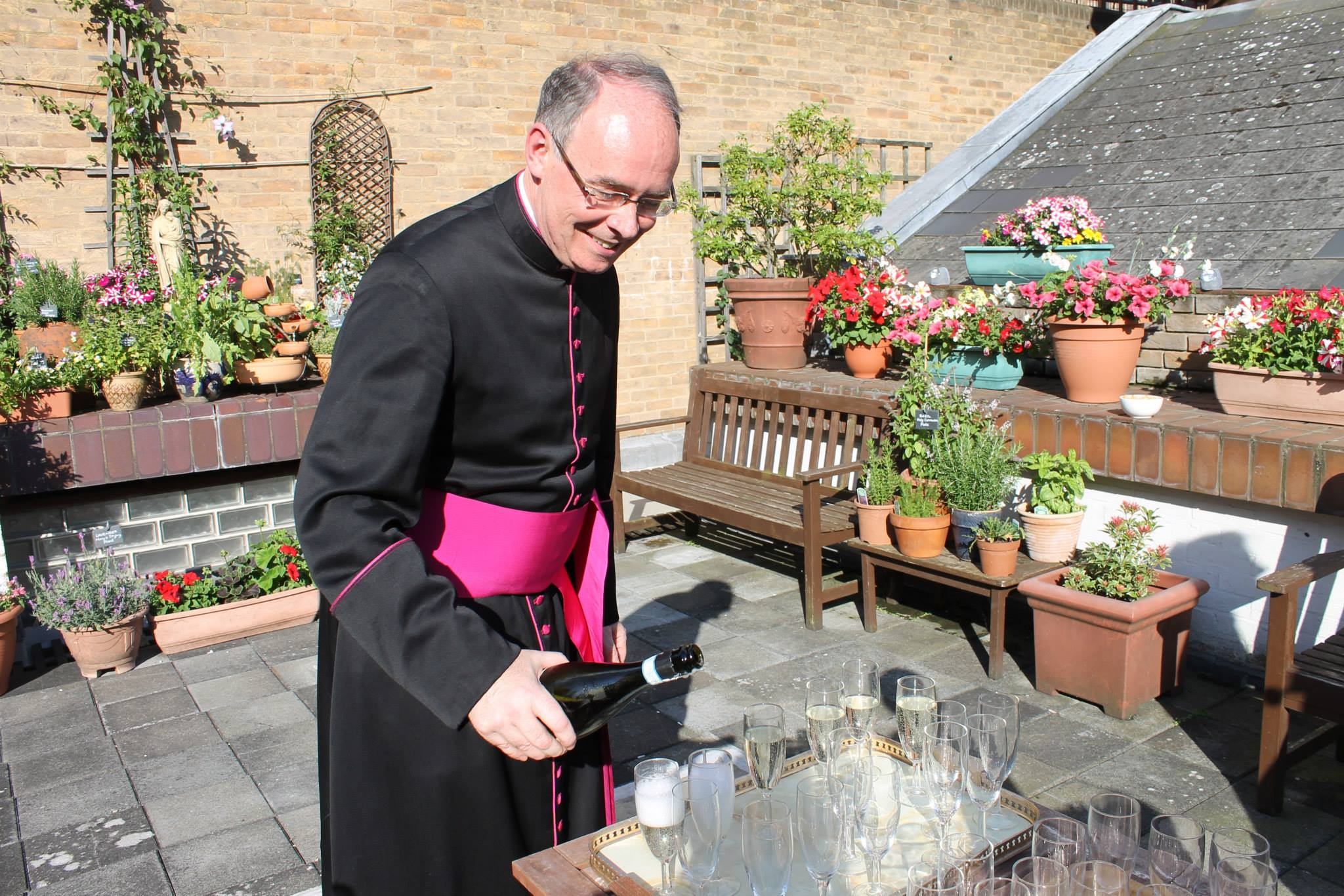
- Monsignor Langham on the Fisher House terrace in 2016
- Church: Roman Catholic Church
- Archdiocese: Westminster
- In office: 2013 to 2021
- Predecessor: Fr Alban McCoy OFM Conv.
- Successor: Fr Alban Hood OSB

Orders
- Ordination: 16 September 1990

Personal details
- Born: Mark Anthony Edmund Langham; 28 November 1960
- Died: 15 January 2021 (aged 60)
- Denomination: Roman Catholicism
- Education: Magdalene College, Cambridge

Mark Anthony Edmund Langham (28 November 1960 – 15 January 2021) was a Catholic priest who served in parishes in his native London, in the Vatican as an official working on inter-church relations and latterly as Catholic chaplain to the University of Cambridge at Fisher House.

== Biography ==
Mark Langham studied at the Cardinal Vaughan Memorial School before proceeding to take a degree in Classics and History at Magdalene College, Cambridge from 1979 to 1983. He was ordained a priest of the Roman Catholic Church on 16 September 1990 by Cardinal Basil Hume.

Langham served in Bayswater where he succeeded the parish priest Michael Hollings and in 2001 was appointed Administrator at Westminster Cathedral. He served at the Cathedral until 2008 during which time he wrote a blog chronicling his work and the wider work of the Cathedral community.

In 2008 he accepted an appointment to the Pontifical Council for Promoting Christian Unity in Rome where he was influential in relations between the Catholic and Anglican Churches during the consolidation of plans to create the Personal Ordinariate of Our Lady of Walsingham.

From 2013 until his death he was chaplain at Fisher House, the University of Cambridge's chaplaincy for Catholic students. In a 2012 Tablet article listing candidates for the episcopacy, he was described as a "clear preacher with a good sense of humour". Langham was "well-liked", and had broad interests, being "a keen amateur painter, a numismatist, a gardener and a dog-lover."

Langham was a prolific writer and contributed to The Tablet, amongst other publications. In 2014, he wrote an article entitled, "God knows where the women bishops vote leaves Anglican-Catholic relations". He was a scholar who published an important book entitled 'The Caroline Divines and the Church of Rome: A Contribution to Current Ecumenical Dialogue' (Routledge, 2018), based on his doctorate which he completed at the Gregorian University in Rome.

Langham died on 15 January 2021, several years after his initial cancer diagnosis.

== Sources ==
- "CUCA | Fisher House". srcf.ucam.org. Archived from the original on 12 January 2016.
- "Vatican appointment for Mgr Mark Langham | Diocese | Roman Catholic Diocese of Westminster". rcdow.org.uk.
- "For Whom The Mitre Waits - from the Tablet Archive". archive.thetablet.co.uk.
