= Darkness Visible =

Darkness Visible is a phrase from Milton's poem Paradise Lost. It may refer to:

== Literature ==
- Darkness Visible (novel), a 1979 novel by British writer Sir William Golding
- Darkness Visible (Hannah book), a 1952 book about Freemasonry by English clergyman Walton Hannah
- Darkness Visible (memoir), a 1989 memoir by U.S. writer William Styron
- Darkness Visible: A Study of Vergil's Aeneid, a 1979 monograph by the classicist W. R. Johnson
- Visible Darkness, a 1959 Russian story and later book by Dmitri Bilenkin

== Music ==
- Darknesse Visible, a piece for solo piano by British composer Thomas Adès based on John Dowland's In darknesse let me dwelle
- Darkness Visible, a piece for symphony orchestra by Spanish composer, Benet Casablancas, with words by Pessoa and Milton
- "Darkness Visible", a song by Mumford & sons from their 2018 album Delta

== Television episodes ==
- "Darkness Visible", an episode of the fantasy television series Hercules: The Legendary Journeys
- "Darkness Visible", an episode of the BBC thriller series Silent Witness
- "Darkness Visible", an episode of the television series La Femme Nikita

== Other uses ==
- Darkness Visible, a 2017 comic series, created by Arvind Ethan David and Mike Carey
- Darkness Visible, a 2017 film written and directed by Neil Biswas
