= Oxford University Catholic Chaplaincy =

- Old Palace
- Bishop King's Palace
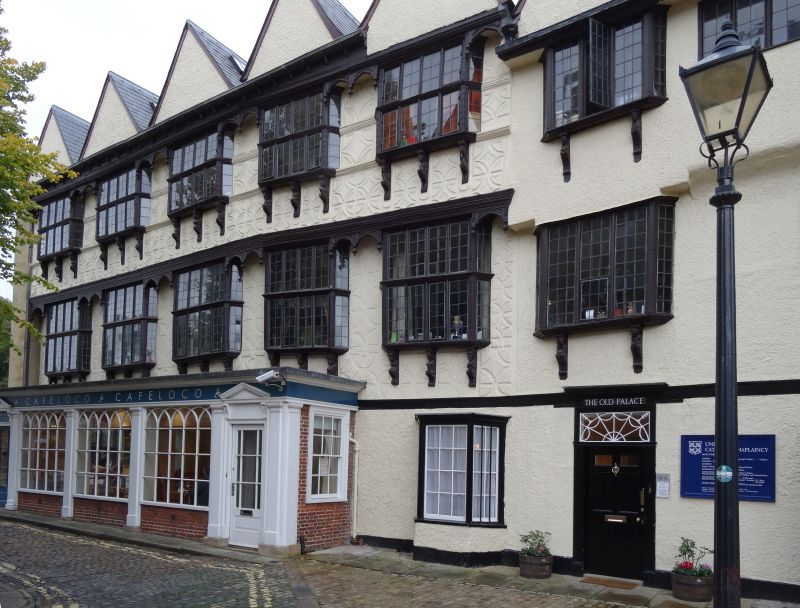
- Rose Place

- Location in Oxford
- 51.749279°N 1.257690°W
- OS grid reference: SP 51399 05861
- Location: Rose Place, Oxford
- Country: England
- Denomination: Roman Catholic
- Website: Catholic-Chaplaincy.org.uk

Architecture
- Heritage designation: Grade I listed
- Designated: 12 January 1954

Oxford University Catholic Chaplaincy is based in the Old Palace, also known as Bishop King's Palace. The chaplaincy started in 1896 and moved into its current premises in 1920. The building was originally constructed in 1485 with another part added to it from 1622. It is situated on the corner of Rose Place and St Aldate's, next to Christ Church Cathedral School and Campion Hall. It is a Grade I listed building.

== History ==
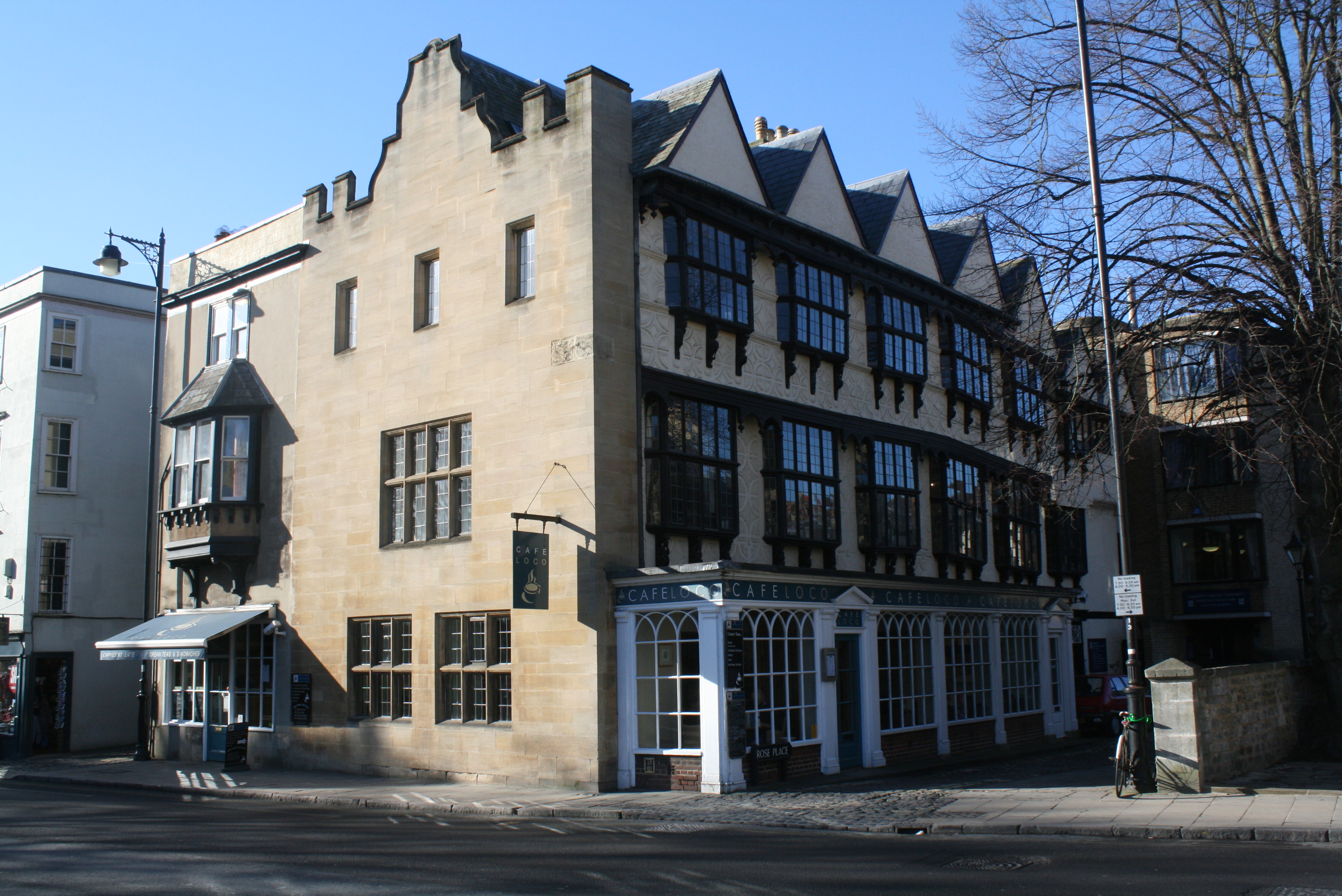
From St Aldate's

It is named after Robert King, the first Bishop of Oxford. However, there are no record of it being a bishop's palace, nor a residence of Robert King.

Originally, it was two houses. The first one, to the west, was built in 1485. In 1621, this house was bought by Thomas Smith. From 1622 to 1628, he then built another larger house for £1,200 to the east next to the house. At the time it was one of the largest houses in Oxford. He was a brewer and built the brewery that Brewer Street is named after. In 1637, he moved to Brewer Street and sold the larger house to Unton Croke. In 1638, he became Mayor of Oxford. At some point later, the two houses were joined.

It is the centre for the Roman Catholic chaplaincy for the University of Oxford. In 1878, a group of Catholics in Oxford got together and formed what would become The Newman Society. In 1917, the Newman Trust bought the Old Palace, and after some renovation work, the chaplain Arthur Stapylton Barnes moved in. In 1931, a new chapel and meeting room were built. In 1947, another new chapel was built.

In the 1950s, the façade was reconstructed. On 12 January 1954, it was registered as a Grade I listed building. In 1972, the house was expanded with a new modern building that houses the chapel, Newman Room, library and student accommodation. Former Catholic chaplains that served the chaplaincy there include Ronald Knox and Crispian Hollis. In 2007, the bishops of England and Wales asked the Jesuits to provide the chaplains and they continue to do so.

== See also ==
- University of Oxford
- The Newman Society
- Cambridge University Catholic Chaplaincy
- Oxford and Cambridge Catholic Education Board
