= Horace Kinder Mann =

Church historian

The Right Reverend Monsignor Horace Kinder Mann
- Born: 27 September 1859; London, England
- Died: 1 August 1928 (aged 68); Edinburgh, Scotland
- Occupations: Church historian, author
- Scientific career
- Fields: History of the papacy
- Institutions: St Cuthbert's High School

Horace Kinder Mann (27 September 1859 – 1 August 1928) was a British Catholic priest, historian and author who specialized in the history of the papacy.

== Biography ==
Mann was born in London, England on 27 September 1859.

He died in Edinburgh, Scotland on 1 August 1928.

== Education ==
After being educated at St Cuthbert's College, Ushaw, Durham, England, he was ordained a priest in 1886.

== Career ==
He taught at St Cuthbert's Grammar School, Newcastle-upon-Tyne, where he became prefect of discipline from 1887 to 1890, and then headmaster, an office he retained until 1917.

In 1917 he was appointed rector of the Beda College in Rome and received from Pope Benedict XV the rank of domestic prelate.

== Bibliography ==
He is the author of a number of notable books:

- Biography of Nicholas Breakspear
- Tombs and Portraits of the Popes of the Middle Ages
- The Lives of the Popes in the Early Middle Ages, 18 volumes

== See also ==
- List of popes
- Pope Adrian IV
