= San Domenico, Arezzo =

Church building in Arezzo, Italy

Coordinates: 43.4691°N 11.8820°E

The Basilica of San Domenico is a Gothic-style church in Arezzo, Tuscany, Italy, dedicated to St Dominic. It is especially renowned for housing a painted crucifix (1265) by Cimabue.

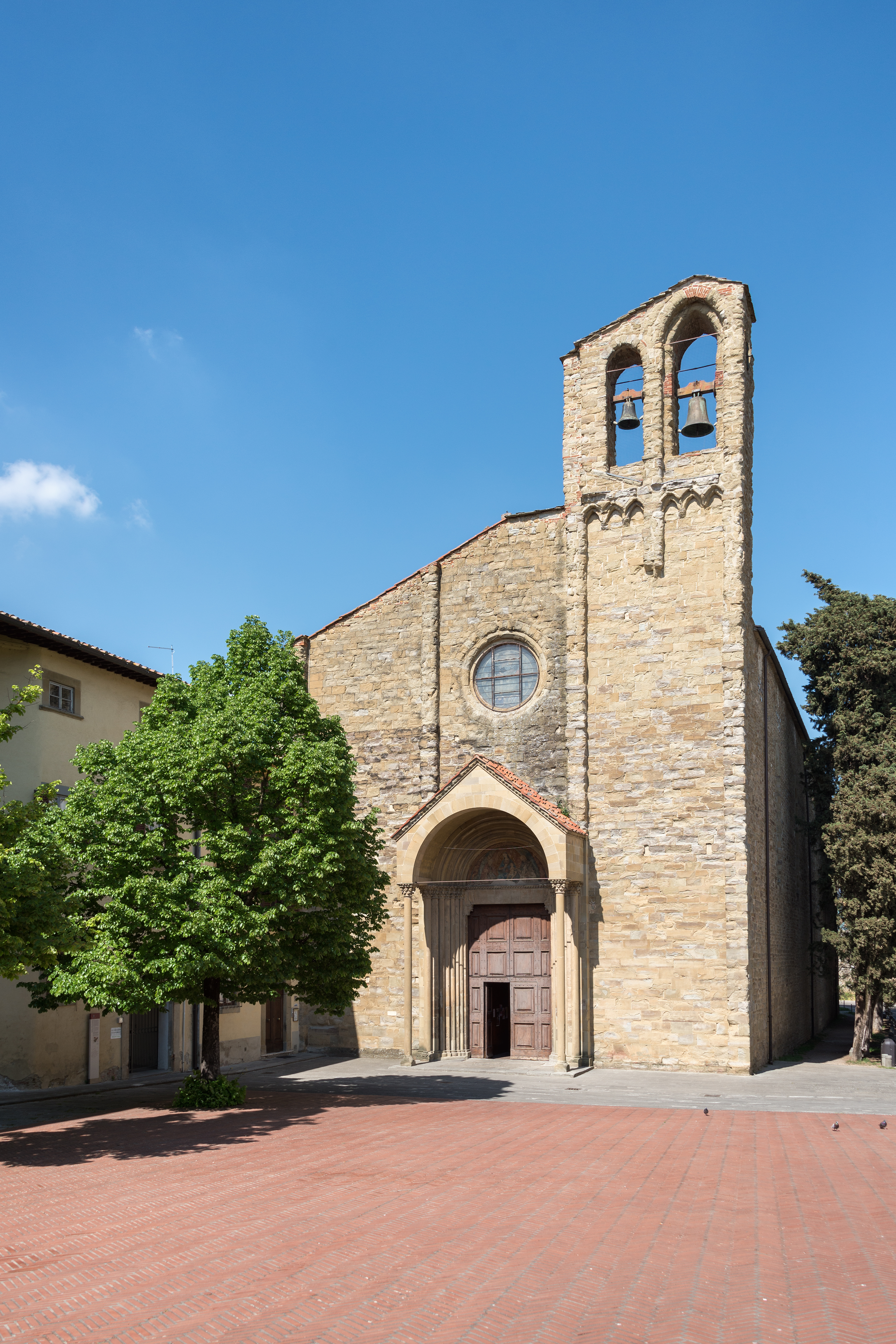
Facade of Church

== History and description ==
The construction began in 1275 and was completed in the 14th century. The exterior is a sober Tuscan Gothic style.

Above the exterior portal entrance is a much dilapidated fresco painted by Agnolo di Lorentino. On the interior wall of the facade, are late 14th-century frescoes depicting Life of Saints Phillip, James the Minor, and Catherine (1395-1400) by Spinello Aretino. Also on this wall, Spinello's son, Parri di Spinello painted the Crucifixion and Three Saints.

The Dragomanni chapel, built from the 14th century, has an altar by Giovanni di Francesco (1368) and frescoes of ‘’Jesus among the Doctors" by Gregorio and Donato di Arezzo. The triptych of ‘’St Michael archangel and Domenic and Paul’’ is attributed to the Maestro del Vescovado. A stone statue of the "Madonna and child" once stood in one of the gates of the city.

Among the other paintings cited in the church in the 19th century were works by Ulisse Ciocchi and an Annunciation by Valerio Bonci.

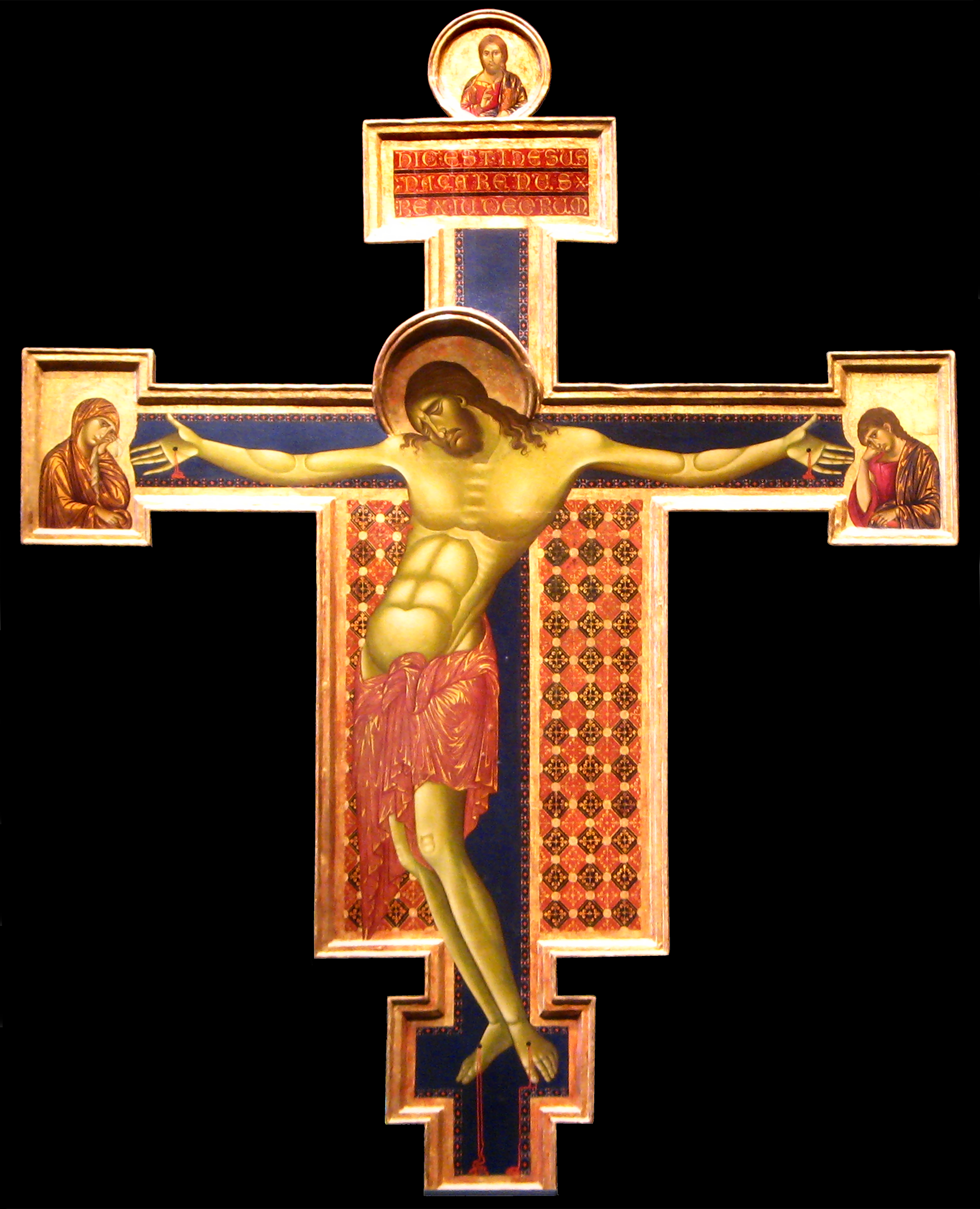
Crucifix by Cimabue

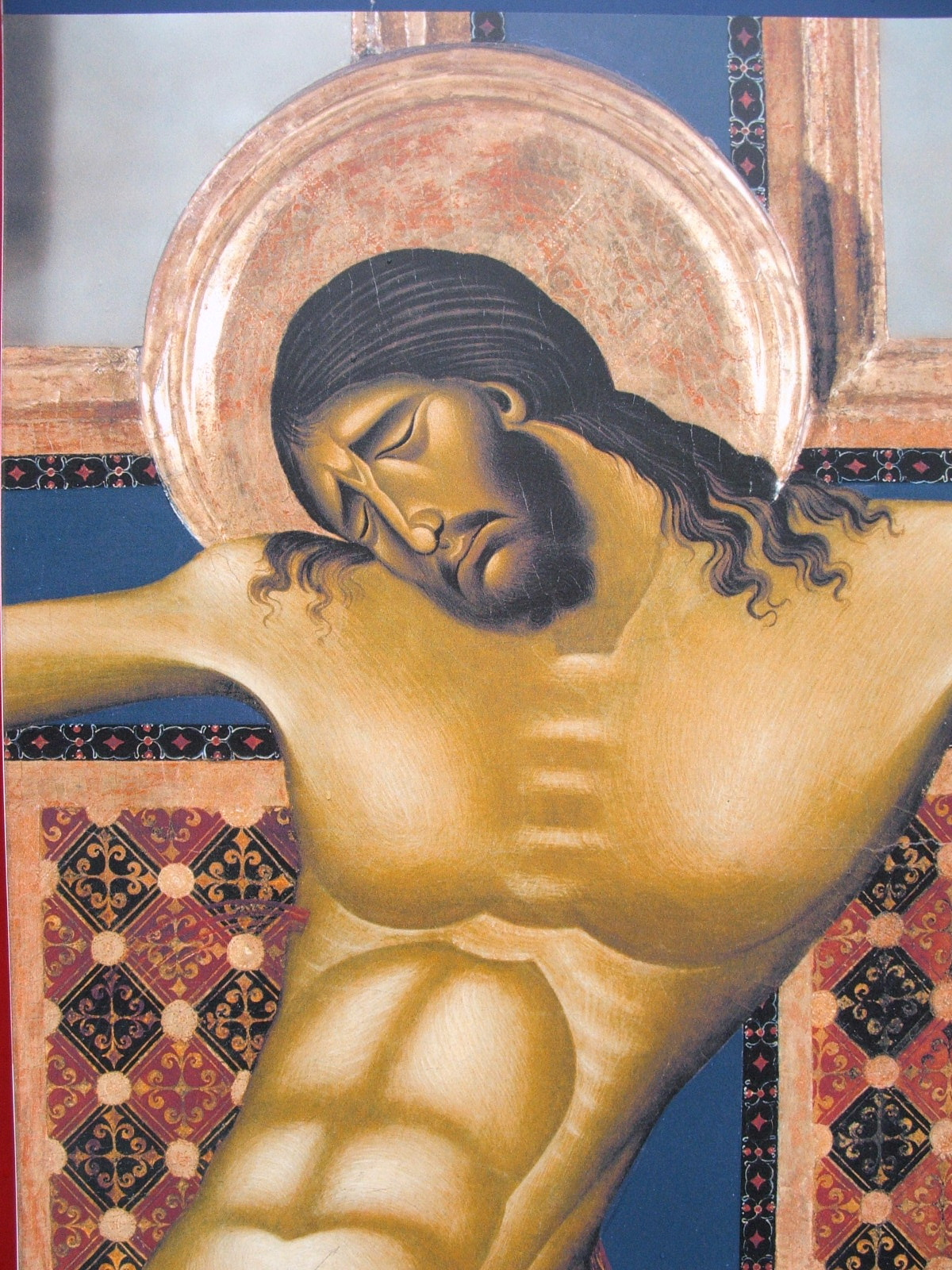
Crucifix (detail) by Cimabue
