= Cambridge University Catholic Chaplaincy =

- Fisher House
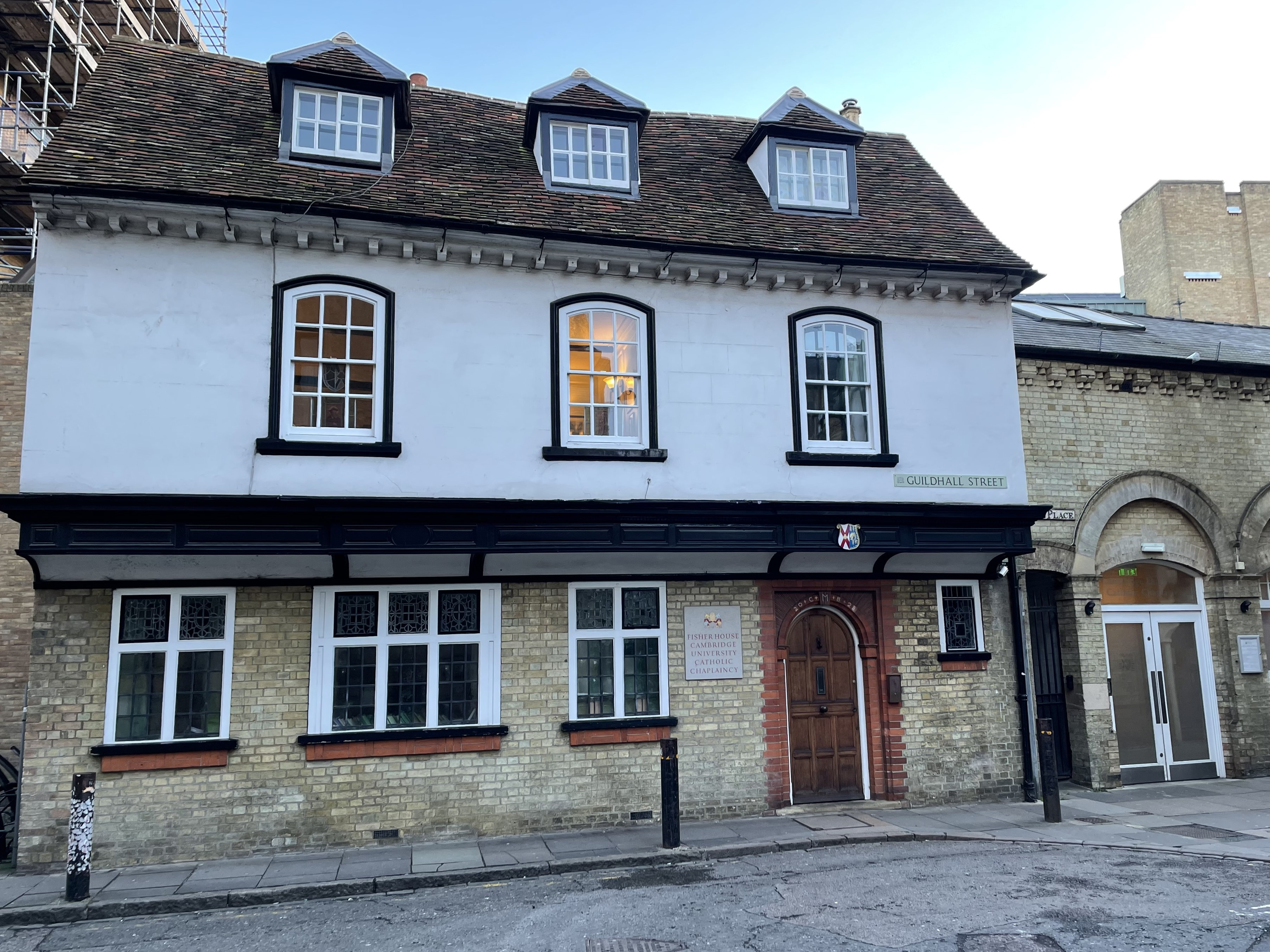
- Fisher House, the home of the Cambridge University Catholic Chaplaincy since 1924

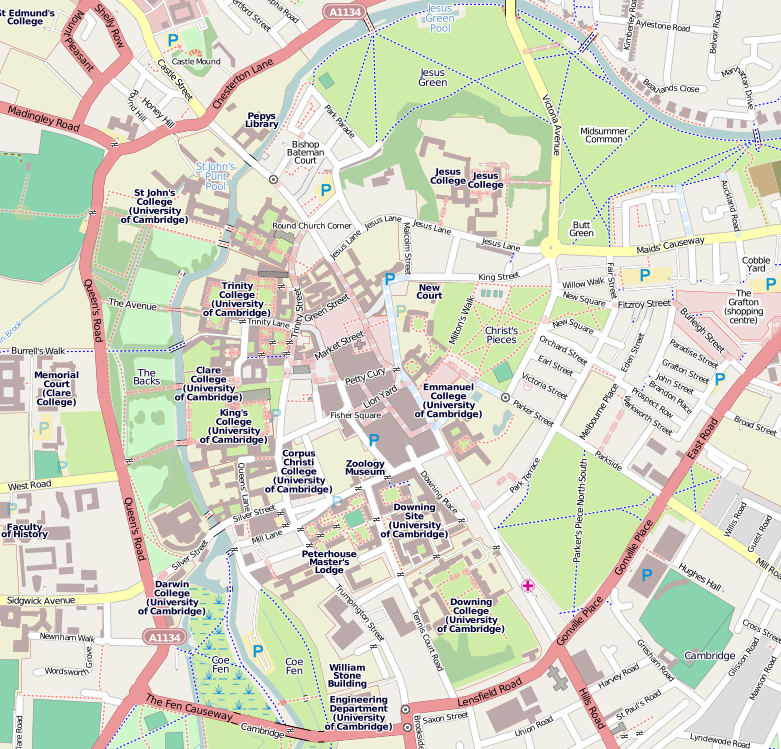
- Location in Cambridge
- 52.20459°N 0.11989°E
- Location: Guildhall Street, Cambridge, CB2 3NH
- Country: England
- Denomination: Roman Catholic
- Website: fisherhouse.org.uk

History
- Founded: 1895
- Founder(s): Pope Leo XIII, Baron Anatole von Hugel, & the Bishops of England and Wales

Architecture
- Heritage designation: Grade II listed

Administration
- Diocese: Overseen by the Oxford and Cambridge Catholic Education Board (OCCEB) on behalf of the BIshops of England and Wales

Clergy
- Bishop: Rt Revd Nicholas Hudson

The Cambridge University Catholic Chaplaincy, known as Fisher House after its patron the English martyr and Chancellor of Cambridge St John Fisher, is the Catholic Chaplaincy of the University of Cambridge in England. Founded in 1895, it has been on Guildhall Street, in Cambridge's city centre, since 1924. The Chaplain is Fr Paul Keane.

== Operation ==
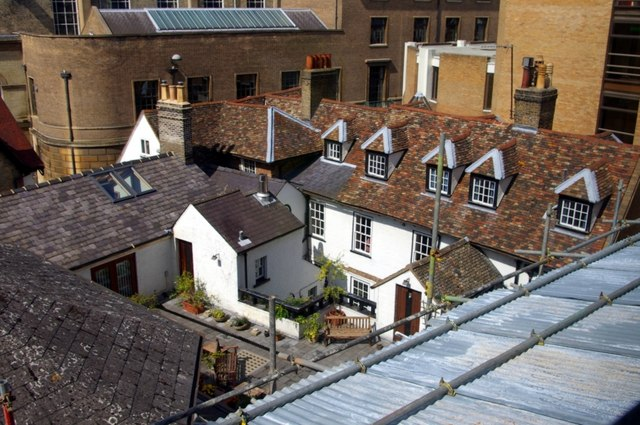
Garden of Fisher House from the upper floor of the Central Library

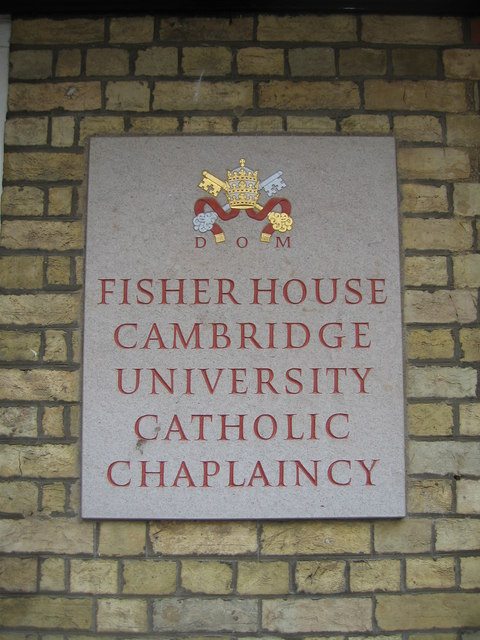
Plaque by the entrance

The Chaplaincy serves all the Catholic members of the University, from undergraduates to Fellows, and anyone else of the university who wishes to attend.

Mass is celebrated every day, and three times on Sundays (during term time): Sung Latin at 9.30 am, Sung English at 11 am, and at 5.30 pm. Weekly events in term time include Apologia on Tuesday nights (supper, guest speaker, Compline and the Bar) and the Black Swan Bar on Friday nights. Some of the significant annual events are the Fisher Mass on the first Bank Holiday in May (celebrated at Great St Mary's), the Fisher and Langham Lectures, the Fisher Society Dinner and Garden Party around May Week, and the Gilbey Requiem Mass in November.

Fisher House is owned by the Cambridge University Catholic Association (CUCA), which is also responsible for the Chaplaincy's finances. The Chaplain is appointed by the Bishops of England and Wales in consultation with the Oxford and Cambridge Catholic Education Board (OCCEB). The day-to-day running of the Chaplaincy is the Chaplain's responsibility, in consultation with CUCA and the Bishops' representative, who is Rt Revd Nicholas Hudson, Auxiliary Bishop of Westminster. The Chaplain is supported in his ministry by the Assistant Chaplains. The Catholic Society for students of the University, the Fisher Society, works closely with the Chaplains, and organises many events.

== History ==
The chaplaincy borrows the arms of its patron, St John Fisher.

=== Foundation and early years (1871-1924) ===
Oxford and Cambridge universities opened their doors to Catholics in 1871 after the repeal of the Test Acts. However, the Congregation for the Propagation of the Faith decreed that it would be next to impossible for the ancient English universities to be frequented without mortal sin, stressing the dangers of an increasing atmosphere of liberalism and scepticism. This decision was met with public outcry from the wealthy laity, who wished for their sons to attend Oxbridge colleges. After a petition led by the Catholic Fellow Baron Anatole von Hügel, this ban was lifted in 1895 by Pope Leo XIII with the condition that a Chaplain be appointed, a Library with Catholic books be founded, and public lectures on philosophy, history and religion be established.

As a result of this, the Universities Catholic Education Board (later OCCEB) was founded and Fr Edmund Nolan was appointed Chaplain. At the same time, the Fisher Society was founded by Cambridge students as a literary and debating society. Henry Fitzalan-Howard, 15th Duke of Norfolk purchased property in Cambridge and the Chaplaincy was established at St Edmund's House in November 1896. The first lectures were given by Cuthbert Butler, OSB, entitled "Questions of the Day".

In 1899, CUCA was founded in order to purchase rooms for the chaplaincy at 2 Green Street. From there, the chaplaincy, under Monsignor Arthur Barnes, moved to Llandaff House, near Downing College. After a two year hiatus during the First World War, Fr Bernard Marshall established the Chaplaincy at 50 Bridge Street, and then 2 Round Church Street, next to the Cambridge Union Society.

=== Fisher House (1924-present) ===
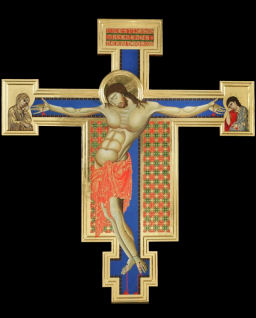
The chaplaincy's replica of Cimabue's crucifix.

In 1924, a Grade II listed pub called the Black Swan on Guildhall St was purchased by CUCA for £10,000. The Chaplaincy and the home of the Chaplain was established here, with the new name of Fisher House. The site consists of two houses of c.1600, joined at right angles to each other, which form the Chaplain's home. Within the Chaplain's home is the Great Chamber, which has been described as one of the most pleasant rooms in Cambridge.

A nineteenth-century wing is for the sole use of members of the university and consists of common room, kitchen, popular library and roof terrace.

The surprisingly large Chapel was completed in 1976, and sympathetically improved in 2011 (the first donation for these works was given by Pope Benedict XVI, who had stayed at Fisher House when he was Cardinal Joseph Ratzinger to give a lecture in 1988). A reconstruction of a c. 1280 Cimabue crucifix, was already in place since 2008, having been commissioned by the Chaplain, Fr Alban McCoy, from the Hamilton Kerr Institute. This 2m artwork was constructed according to contemporary medieval Italian methods, in particular those documented in Cennino Cennini’s c. 1400 work Libro dell’Arte.

Mgr Alfred Gilbey, who was the Chaplain for 100 terms (1932-1965), is buried in the courtyard. He saved Fisher House from demolition in the Sixties when the other early modern properties surrounding it were destroyed by the Council. Yet, it is not the buildings that make Fisher House but the students and other members of the University who worship at the Chaplaincy and create so many opportunities to grow in faith and enjoy each other's company.

== List of the Chaplains ==
- Fr Edmund Nolan (1896–05)
- Mgr Arthur Barnes (1905–16)
- Fr James Bernard Marshall (1918–22)
- Fr John Lopes (1922–28)
- Fr George MacGillivray (1928–32)
- Mgr Alfred Gilbey (1932–65)
- Fr Richard Incledon (1965–77)
- Fr Maurice Couve de Murville (1977–82)
- Dom Christopher Jenkins OSB (1982–88)
- Fr John Osman (1988–94)
- Fr Allan White OP (1994–2000)
- Fr Alban McCoy OFM Conv (2000–13)
- Mgr Mark Langham (2013–21)
- Dom Alban Hood OSB (2021–22)
- Fr Paul Keane (2022-)

== See also ==
- Oxford University Catholic Chaplaincy
- Oxford University Newman Society
- Oxford and Cambridge Catholic Education Board
