= Crucifix (Cimabue, Arezzo) =

Painting by Cimabue

Crucifix by Cimabue at Arezzo
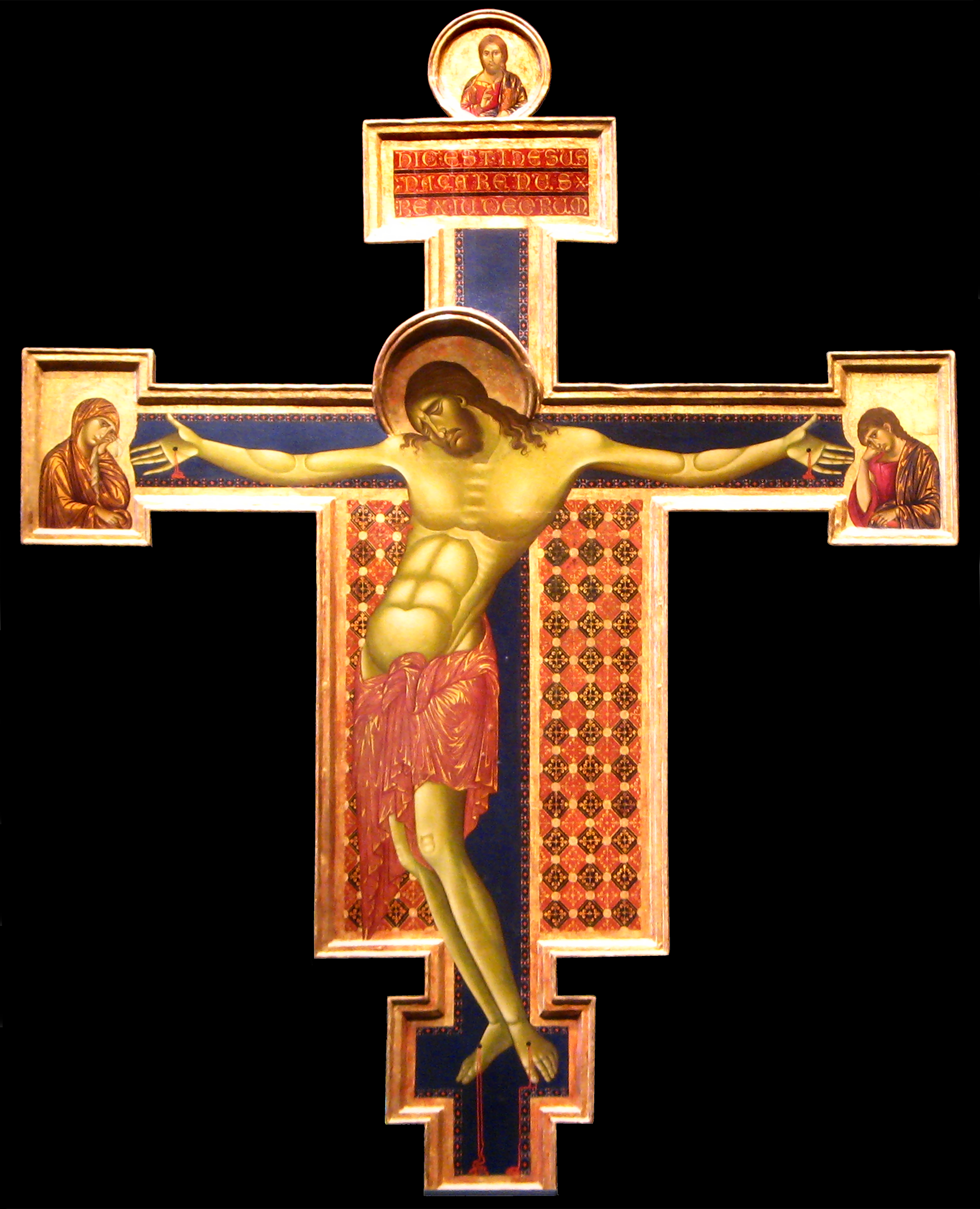
- Artist: Cimabue
- Year: 1267–71
- Medium: Distemper and gold on wood panel
- Dimensions: 336 cm × 267 cm (132 in × 105 in)
- Location: Basilica of San Domenico; Arezzo

The Crucifix by Cimabue at Arezzo is a large wooden crucifix painted in distemper, with gold leaf, by the Florentine painter and mosaicist Cimabue, dated to c. 1267–71. It is the earliest of two large crucifixes attributed to him. It shows a painted representation of the near dead body of Christ on the cross, with Mary, mother of Jesus and John the Evangelist at either end of the cross beams.

Its importance lies, in part, in the stylistic innovations and departure from some of the prevailing Byzantine conventions of the time, towards greater expressionism (especially in its portrayal of the agonies of death by crucifixion), empathy and humanism. In this, the work seeks to appeal to the viewer's heart rather than mind, and perhaps attempt to break the barrier between viewer and deity.

The dating is based on stylistic advancements. The crucifix has been in situ at Arezzo since its completion. Art historians have established it as probably one of Cimabue's earliest works.

== Commission and attribution ==
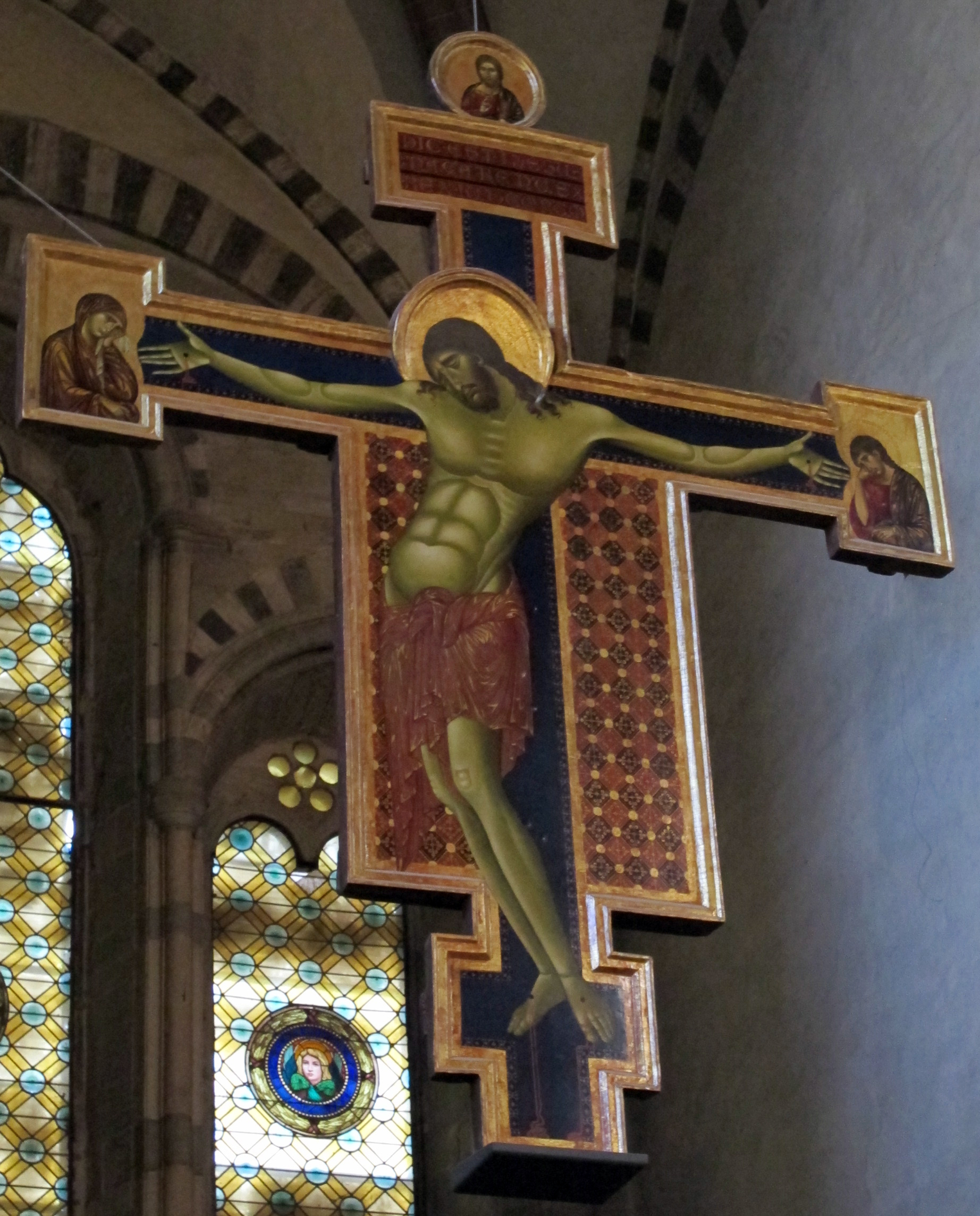
In situ

The Crucifix was commissioned by members of the Dominican Order for the Basilica of San Domenico, Arezzo, Tuscany, where it has hung since its completion, above the high altar; occupying, in the words of art historian Monica Chiellini, the "position of absolute prestige...and the most decorative element [in a medieval church]".

Art historian Christopher Kleinhenz believes the move away from the Byzantine style was motivated by a desire to emphasise the "immediate, accessible, and human aspects of the deity", in line with the doctrines of piety emerging from both the Dominican and Franciscan orders.

== Description ==
The panels are brightly painted and gilded, to fit the style of a 13th-century church, where it would have been among similarly coloured frescos, capitals, icon paintings and stained glass windows. The arms of the cross are embellished with painted coloured hanging cloths.

The work has undergone two restorations, in 1917 and 2005, but is generally good condition considering its fragility and age.

=== Christ ===
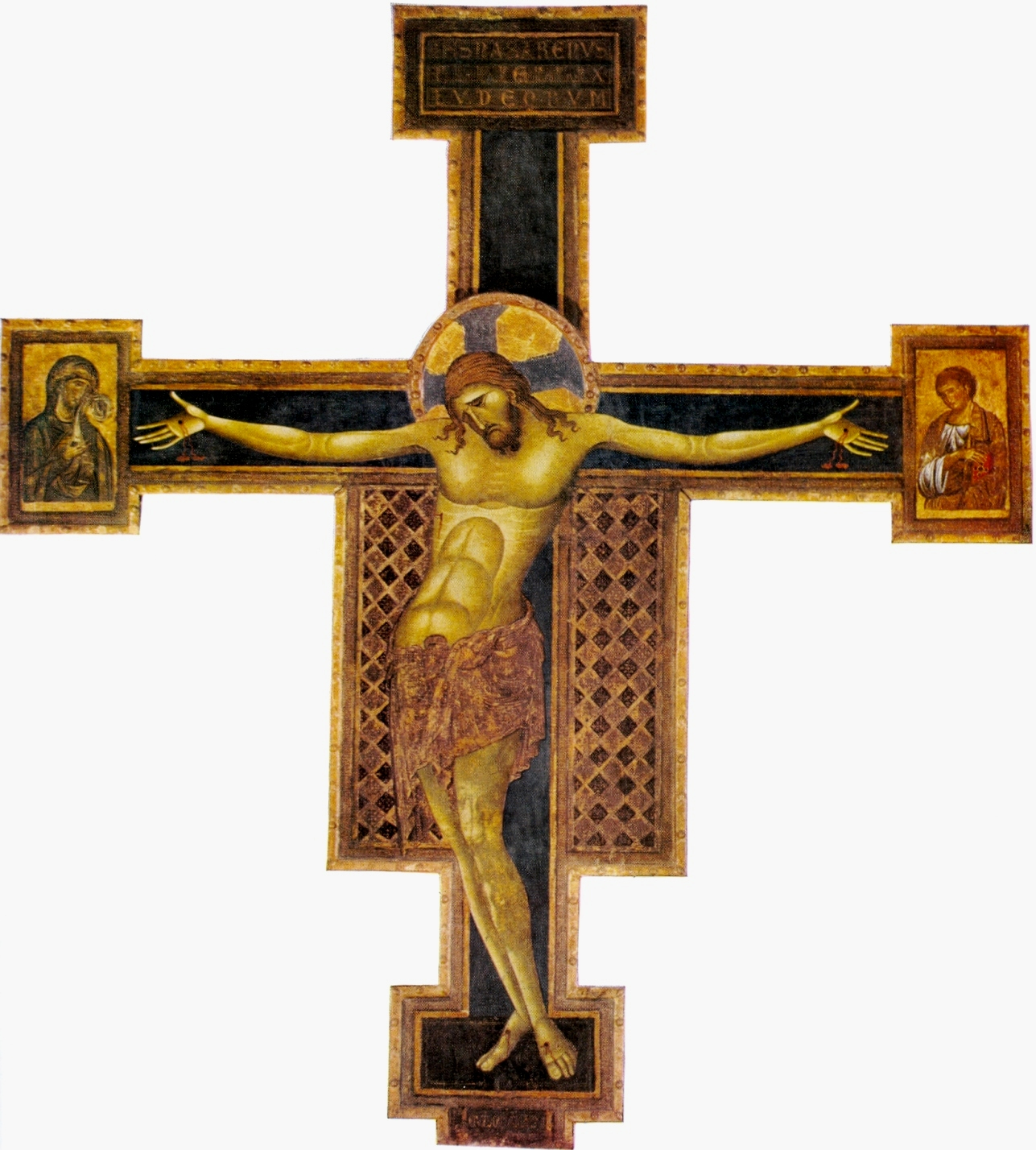
Giunta Pisano's painted crucifix of c 1250–52, now in Bologna, Northern Italy, was a basis for Cimabue's work

The crucifix was painted in the Christus patiens ("Suffering Christ") style that emerged from the mid-13th century. It displays the dying Christ on the cross, his eyes closed, his head resting on his shoulder, as his body buckles to the left. The sway of his rigid body indicates contortions brought about by pain. He wears a red gilded loincloth to cover his modesty. The predominance of green hues emphasised the examination of near death and decay.

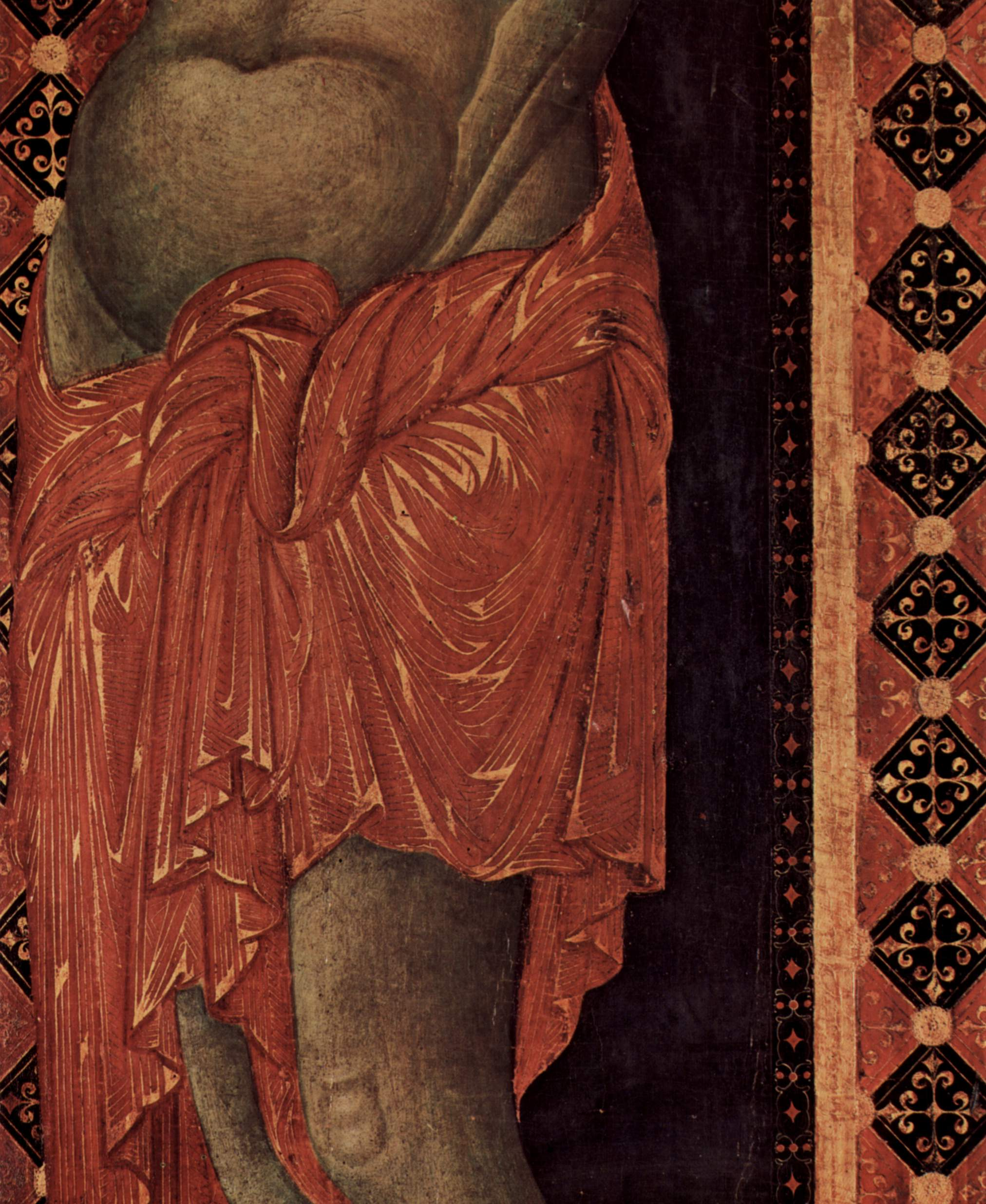
Loincloth, with gold highlights

It is closely modeled on the crucifix by Giunta Pisano, now in the Basilica of San Domenico, Bologna. This is most especially seen in the contortions and body type of Christ, the drapery, the architecture of the cross beams, the patterned borders and the figures of Mary and John the Evangelist at either end of the vertical cross beams. However, Cimabue goes further, especially in its portrayal of Christ's agony invoked by the contortions of his body. This is evident in that his body leans far more towards the viewer's left, and that his loincloth obscures a greater part of the patterned border alongside the crossbeam.

The plaque on the vertical bar above Christ's head bears the INRI inscription Hic est Iesus Nazarenus, Rex Iudeorum ("Here is Jesus the Nazarene, King of the Jews"). Above this again is a small panel showing Christ with his hand raised in blessing.

=== Mary and John ===
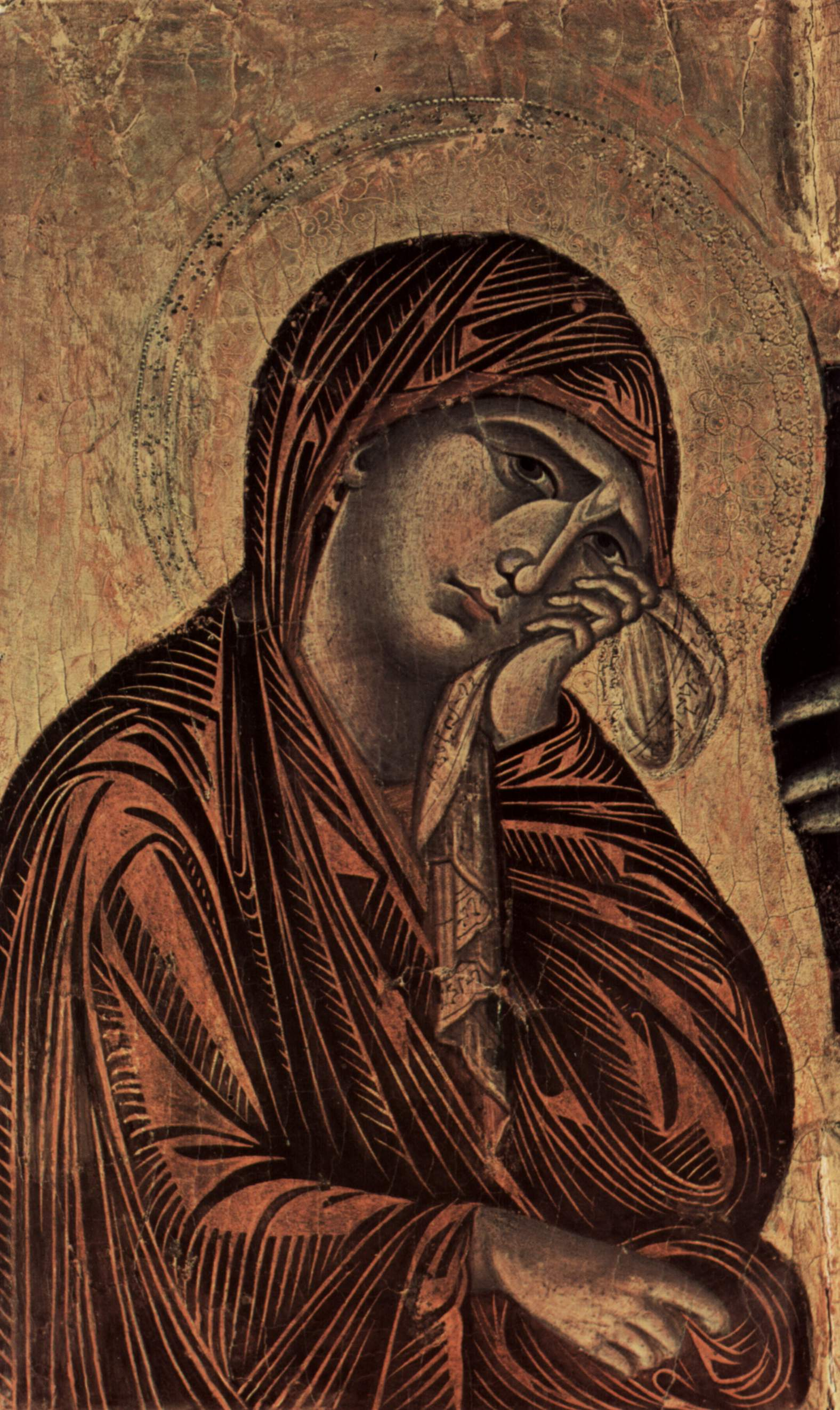
Mary, mother of Jesus

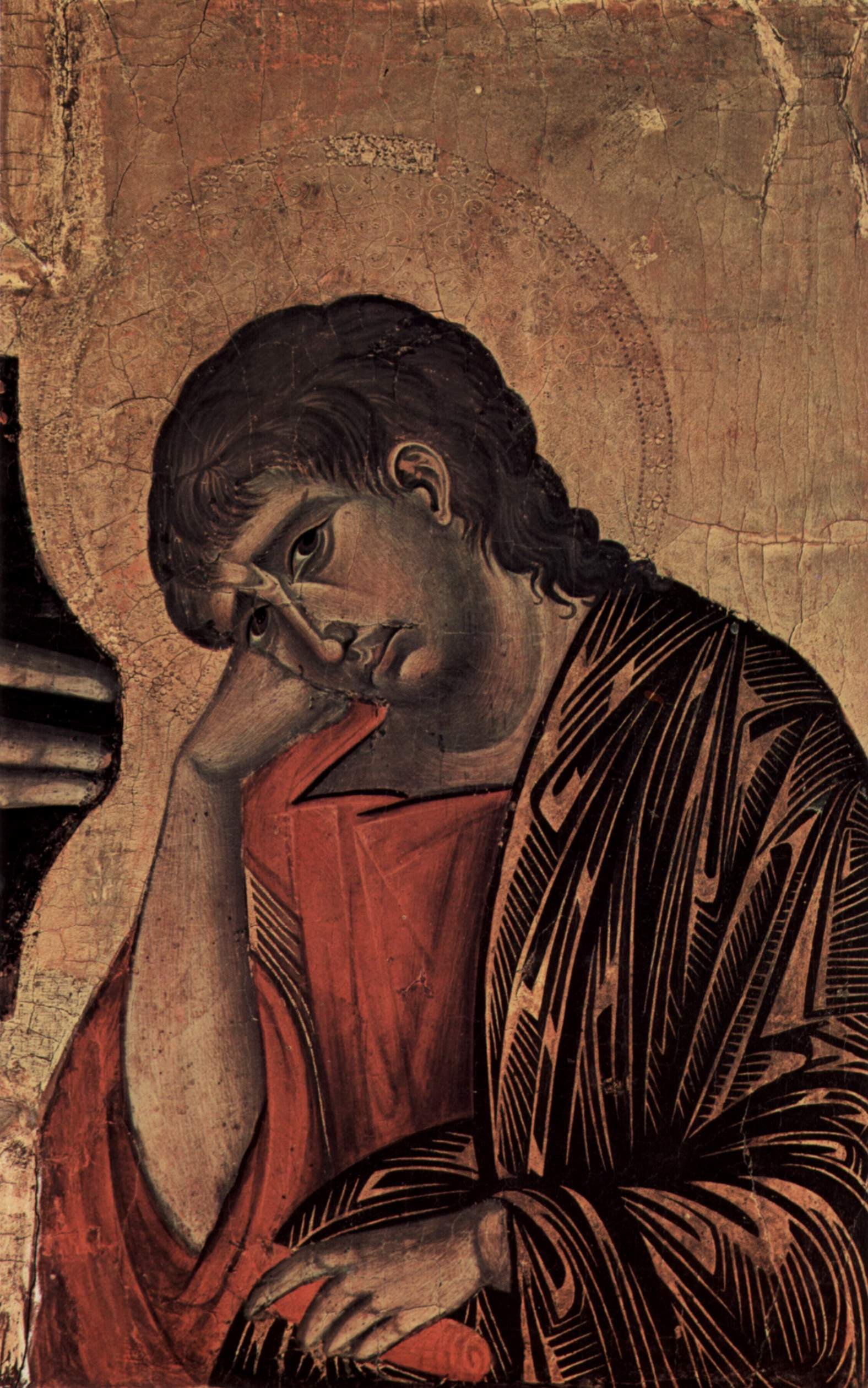
John the Evangelist

The mourning figures of Mary and John the Evangelist are shown at half length at either end of the vertical cross beams. Both rest their heads on their hands, while Mary is shown weeping.

The saints are painted with bright coloured hues, with gold highlights along the lines of their clothes (this gilding is absent in the more austere Santa Croce panels).

== Fisher House reconstruction ==
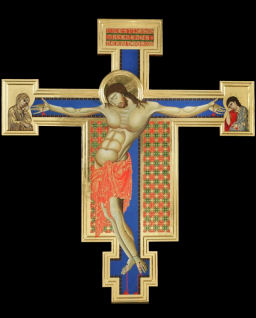
Fisher House's replica of Cimabue's crucifix.

In 2005, a reconstruction of the crucifix was commissioned from the Hamilton Kerr Institute for Fisher House, the Catholic Chaplaincy to the University of Cambridge. This 2-metre artwork was constructed according to contemporary medieval Italian methods, in particular those documented in Cennino Cennini’s c. 1400 work Libro dell’Arte. The crucifix was completed in March 2008, installed at Fisher House and consecrated by Cardinal Cormac Murphy-O'Connor.

== Sources ==
- Chiellini, Monica. Cimabue. London: Scala Books, 1988. ISBN 978-0-935748-90-1
- Kleinhenz, Christopher. Medieval Italy: An Encyclopedia. Routledge, 2003. ISBN 978-0-4159-3929-4
- Osborne, Harold. The Oxford Companion to Art. Oxford: Clarendon Press, 1970. ISBN 978-0-19-866107-8
