= Alfred Newman Gilbey =

British priest

The Reverend Monsignor Alfred Newman Gilbey
- Catholic chaplain to the University of Cambridge
- Church: Catholic Church
- In office: 1932–1965
- Predecessor: George MacGillivray
- Successor: Richard Incledon

Orders
- Ordination: 1929 by Arthur Doubleday

Personal details
- Born: 13 July 1901 Harlow, Essex, England
- Died: 26 March 1998 (aged 96)
- Education: Trinity College, Cambridge; Pontifical Beda College

Alfred Newman Gilbey (13 July 1901 – 26 March 1998) was a British Catholic priest and monsignor. He was the longest-serving chaplain to the University of Cambridge, England. He has been described as the best-known Roman Catholic priest in England during the last quarter of the 20th century.

== Early life (1901–1932) ==
Gilbey was born at Mark Hall, near Harlow, Essex, on 13 July 1901, fifth son of Newman Gilbey, JP and María Victorina de Ysasi. Newman Gilbey's father, Alfred, of Wooburn House, Wooburn, Buckinghamshire, had founded a successful wine business with his brother, Sir Walter Gilbey, 1st Baronet. A maternal great-grandfather was Don Manuel María González y Angel, founder of a Spanish wine and sherry bodega González Byass. Educated by Jesuits at Beaumont College, he went on to study modern history at Trinity College, Cambridge in 1920, during which time he became chairman of the Fisher Society at the chaplaincy; he was also a member the University Pitt Club. He funded his own training as a priest at the Pontifical Beda College in Rome, being ordained "under his own patrimony" by Bishop Doubleday of Brentwood in 1929.

== Fisher House and retirement (1932–1998) ==
In 1932, Gilbey became Catholic chaplain to the University of Cambridge, residing at Fisher House. Gilbey exerted a quiet but considerable influence around the university, maintaining links with the colleges and overseeing many converts to Catholicism. He was a traditionalist Catholic, was against the equality of the sexes, and was strongly opposed to women being admitted to the university; when women were fully admitted to the university in 1948, he continued to refuse to allow women to become part of the chaplaincy. He was instrumental in defending Fisher House, as from 1949 the Cambridge City Council planned to demolish the buildings in the area to make way for the Lion Yard development. After petitioning led by Gilbey, who maintained that the chaplaincy would be demolished "over his dead body", Fisher House was spared from the compulsory purchase order and remains standing to this day. In 1950, Gilbey was made a domestic prelate by Pope Pius XII, and therefore granted the title Monsignor.

Gilbey retired from the chaplaincy in 1965, the final year of the Second Vatican Council. Unhappy with the Fisher Society's decision to admit women to the chaplaincy, who had been allowed to be full members of the university in 1947, Gilbey decided to leave rather than compromise his traditionalist beliefs. He took up permanent residence at the Travellers Club in London, remaining active into his nineties. During this time he wrote the catechetical book, We Believe (1983), making a trip to the United States in 1995 to promote it.

== Death and legacy ==
In early 1998, Gilbey moved to Nazareth House in Hammersmith, London, a nursing home. He died two months later, on 26 March 1998. His funeral was held in the Brompton Oratory on 6 April with a Tridentine Solemn Mass. He is buried in the courtyard of Fisher House in Cambridge. A Requiem Mass for the repose of his soul is sung, again in the Tridentine form, annually at Trinity College.
