= Darkness Visible (Hannah book) =

Book by Walton Hannah

- Author: Walton Hannah
- Publisher: Augustine Press
- Publication date: 1952

Darkness Visible: A Christian Appraisal of Freemasonry is a 1952 book on Freemasonry written by Walton Hannah, who was then an Anglican priest. Darkness Visible has been influential among Christians, cited by both the General Synod of the Church of England and the United States Conference of Catholic Bishops as a reason for their concern about the compatibility of Freemasonry and Christianity.

Addressing the book primarily to Anglicans, Hannah attempted to demonstrate that Freemasonry was incompatible with Christianity in general and avoided discussion of Masonic conspiracies. He did praise Freemasonry, saying that many Masons were of the "highest distinction and repute" and commending Freemasonry's charitable works. Hannah's criticisms were focused upon the texts of Masonic rituals.

Darkness Visible is in two sections. In the first section, various elements of Freemasonry are argued to be incompatible with Christianity. These include the harsh nature of Masonic obligations (oaths) and the religious aspects of Freemasonry. He also lists the condemnations of Freemasonry by various Christian denominations. The second section discusses Masonic rituals, particularly the first degree initiation ceremony, the second degree passing ceremony and the third degree raising ceremony, and a reprint of Darkness Visible claimed that the book was used by new initiates for learning their initiation rituals, as it was easier to use than official Masonic copies.

== See also ==
- Christianity and Freemasonry
