= Alban McCoy =

British Catholic writer and priest

The Reverend Fr Alban McCoy OFM Conv
- Praelector of St Edmund's College, Cambridge
- Church: Roman Catholic Church
- Province: Province of Westminster
- Diocese: Diocese of East Anglia
- In office: 2013 to present
- Other posts: Chaplain to the University of Cambridge; Dean of St Edmund's College, Cambridge

Orders
- Ordination: 20 December 1975

Personal details
- Born: 1 August 1951 (age 75)
- Denomination: Roman Catholic
- Education: University of Kent; University of Oxford

Fr. Alban McCoy OFM Conv is a British Catholic writer and priest.

McCoy is the author of An Intelligent Person's Guide to Christian Ethics (2004) and An Intelligent Person's Guide to Catholicism (2005, new ed. 2008). Since 1995, he has been the religious books editor of The Tablet.

From 2000 to 2013, he was the Catholic chaplain to the University of Cambridge, and then served as Dean (and Acting Dean) of St Edmund's College until 2020.

He is currently Praelector and Wine Steward of St Edmund's College, Cambridge and Visiting Professor at the Peruvian University of Applied Sciences in Lima.
