= Walton Hannah =

William Walton Thomson Hannah (9 October 1912 – 26 February 1966) was an English priest from Forest Row, Sussex. Originally an Anglican priest, he later became a Roman Catholic priest. He was the author the controversial book Darkness Visible about Freemasonry.

In January 1951, Hannah wrote an article, "Should a Christian be a Freemason?", in Theology, a magazine produced by the Society for Promoting Christian Knowledge. This was controversial, as both the King and Geoffrey Fisher, the Archbishop of Canterbury, were Freemasons, as were many Anglican clerics. The Church of England Assembly discussed the subject in June 1951, although there was no substantive conclusion.

Darkness Visible was published in 1952. He later published Christian by Degrees, left England for Canada and became a Roman Catholic priest.

Hannah earned his M.A. from the University of Edinburgh in 1934. He died in Montreal in 1966.

== Works ==
- Darkness Visible, 1952. ISBN 1-901157-70-9
- Christian by Degrees, 1954. ISBN 0-85172-892-8
