= Oxford and Cambridge Catholic Education Board =

The Oxford and Cambridge Catholic Education Board (OCCEB) is the charitable body responsible for appointing the Catholic chaplains to the universities of Oxford and Cambridge.

OCCEB was established by the Vatican in 1895 as the Universities Catholic Education Board in response to the Universities Tests Act 1871. As of November 2022, the current Chair is the Right Reverend Nicholas Hudson.
