= Giovanni di Piamonte =

Italian painter

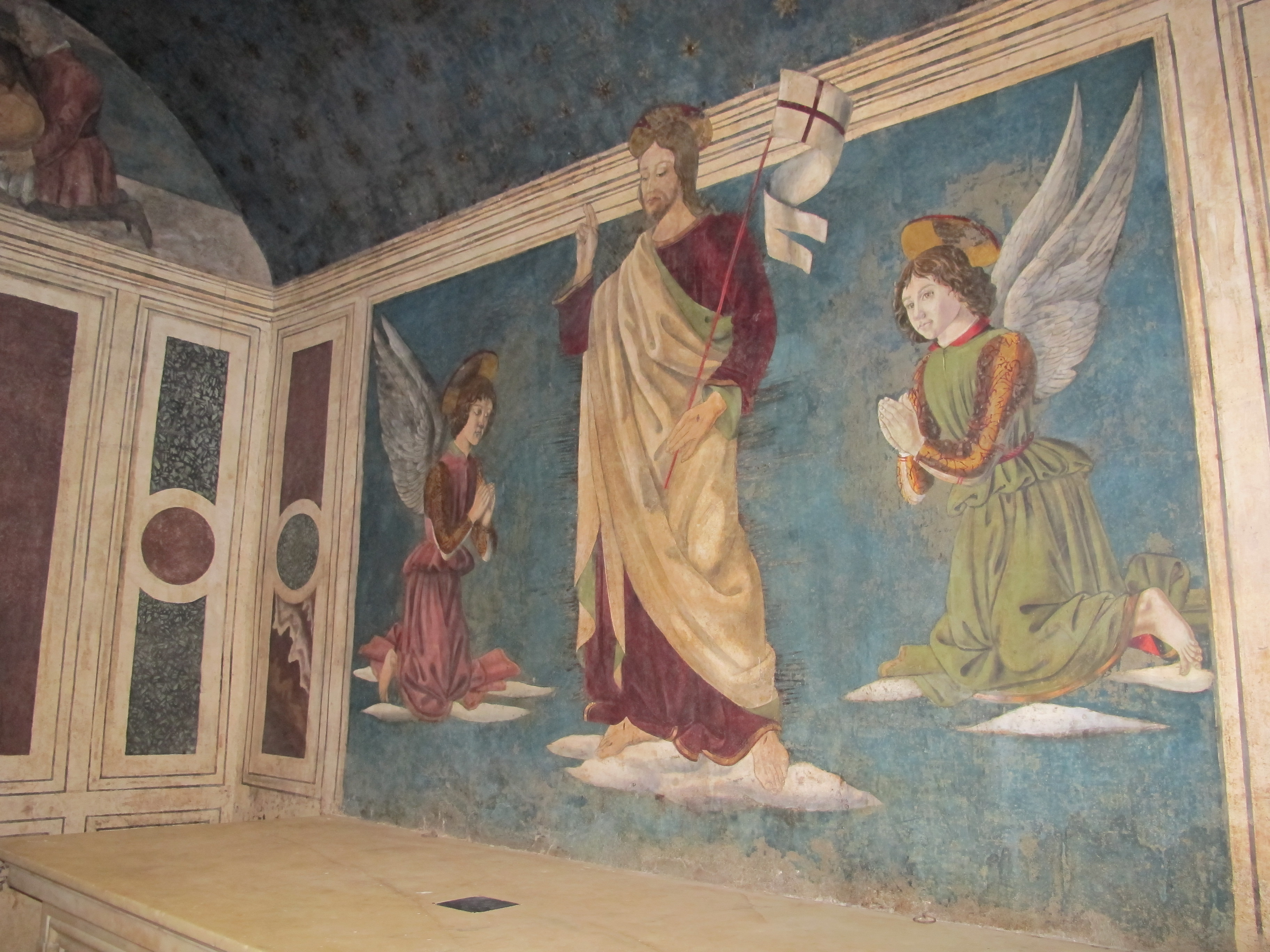
Giovanni di Piamonte's fresco of the resurrected Christ in the Rucellai Sepulchre

Giovanni di Piamonte was a 15th-century Italian painter. The date and place of his birth are not known, but his name indicates that he was born in Piamonte near the present-day town of Pontassieve in Tuscany. He trained in the circle of Piero della Francesca and was one of his assistants.

An early painting dated 1456 is an altarpiece entitled Madonna Enthroned and Saints found in Santa Maria delle Grazie, Città di Castello; it is the only work known with certainty to be from his hand. This altarpiece was painted at approximately the same time that Piero della Francesca and his workshop were painting the fresco cycle of The History of the True Cross in the Cappella Maggiore of the church San Francesco, Arezzo. The Città di Castello Madonna displays the influence of Piero but not a detailed knowledge of Piero's cartoons. As an assistant to Piero in Arezzo during the painting of The History of the True Cross cycle, Giovanni is usually credited with painting two scenes: Burial of the Sacred Wood and The Torture of Judas the Jew.

A later work of 1471, Sant'Anna Metterza (Staatliche Museen, Berlin), is attributed to Giovanni by art historian Luciano Bellosi. In contrast to the early Madonna, this mature painting reveals a close knowledge of Piero's work and a mastery of perspective.

Bellosi also attributes to him the frescoes on the interior walls and vault of the Rucellai Sepulchre, in a chapel of the church of San Pancrazio in Florence.
