= Museo Marino Marini =

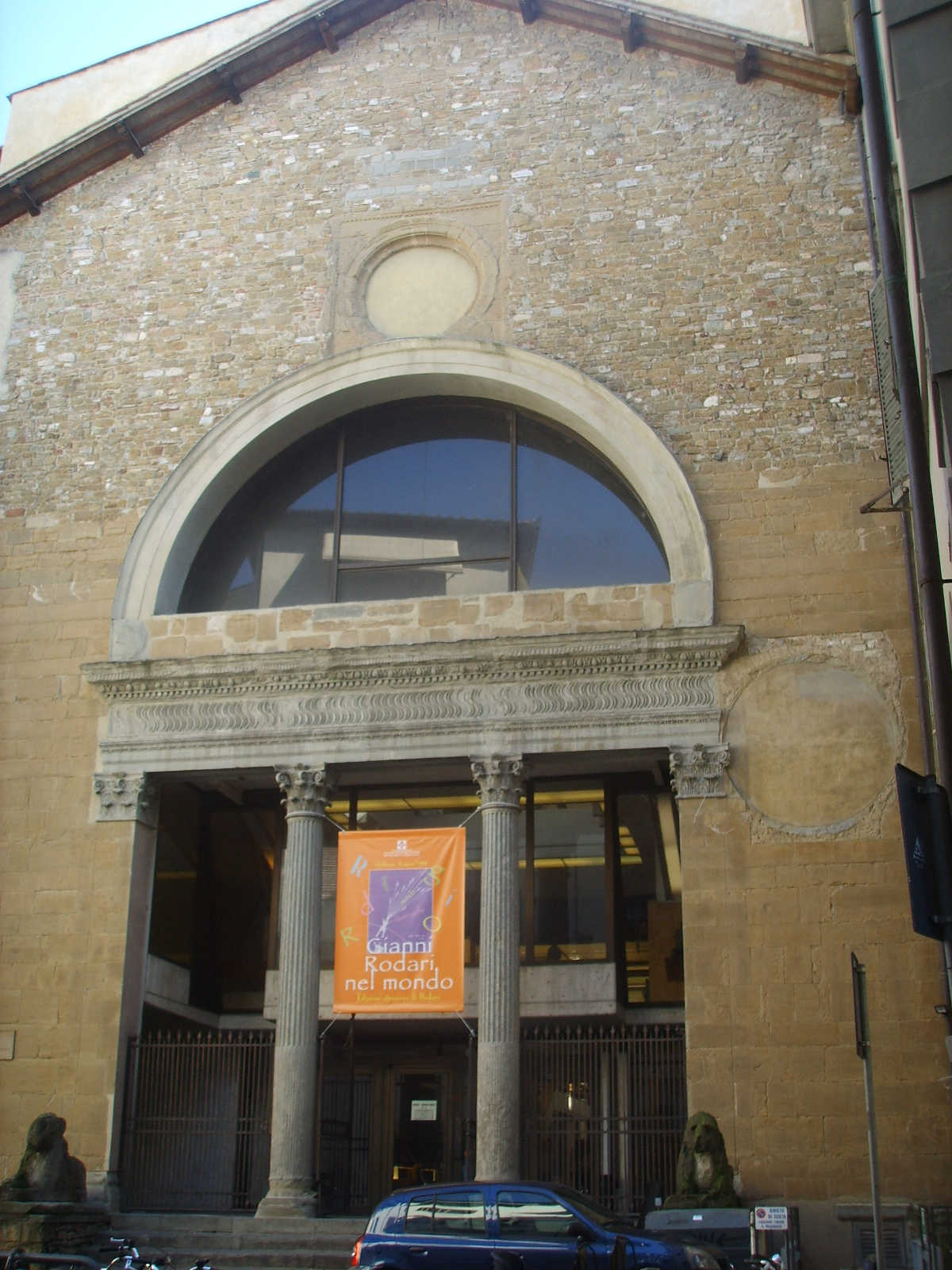
Church of San Pancrazio, entrance

Marino Marini (1901–1980) was one of the most important Italian artists of the twentieth century, especially as a sculptor. He was born in Pistoia, but he studied art in Florence, before moving to Monza as a teacher and finally arriving at the prestigious Academy of Fine Arts of Brera in Milan. The museum houses the second-largest collection of his works, after the collection dedicated to him in his hometown.

The Marino Marini Museum is housed in the ancient church of San Pancrazio. The church was transformed in the 1980s by architects Lorenzo Papi and Bruno Sacchi, who renovated the building in line with a "dynamic" reading of the work of sculptural Marini, creating a dialogue between historical and contemporary materials existing buildings. The building is as notable for its successful marriage of contemporary and ancient architecture as it is for its collection.

Within the walls of the ex-church stands the Sacellum of the Holy Sepulchre also known as the Rucellai Sepulchre, which is still considered sacred. The interior of the sacellum is composed of a single burial chamber containing a marble slab placed against the southern wall. The exterior is decorated with 30 different marble inlay intarsia set inside framed squares and are inspired by vegetation such as laurel and oak leaves or flowers, while some depict geometrical forms such as the eight or six-pointed star, designed by artist Leon Battista Alberti (1401–1472). The Marino Marini sculptures are rugged and essential forms, and among the most recurrent subjects are the horse and rider, explored in a range of poses and moods, from fatigue to danger, to eroticism. Pomona—the traditional figure, feminine, rounded and often fraught symbol of fertility since the time of the Etruscans- is another recurring symbol.
