= Rucellai Chapel =

Rucellai Chapel or Cappella Rucellai may refer to:

- The Rucellai Chapel in the Basilica of Santa Maria Novella, in Florence, Italy
- The Rucellai Chapel in the church of San Pancrazio, Florence, Italy
- The Rucellai Chapel in the Pieve di Santo Stefano, in Campi Bisenzio, in the province of Florence, Italy
- The "Rucellai o Dei Beati" Chapel of the church of Sant'Andrea della Valle, in Rome, Italy
