= Benedetto Sinigardi =

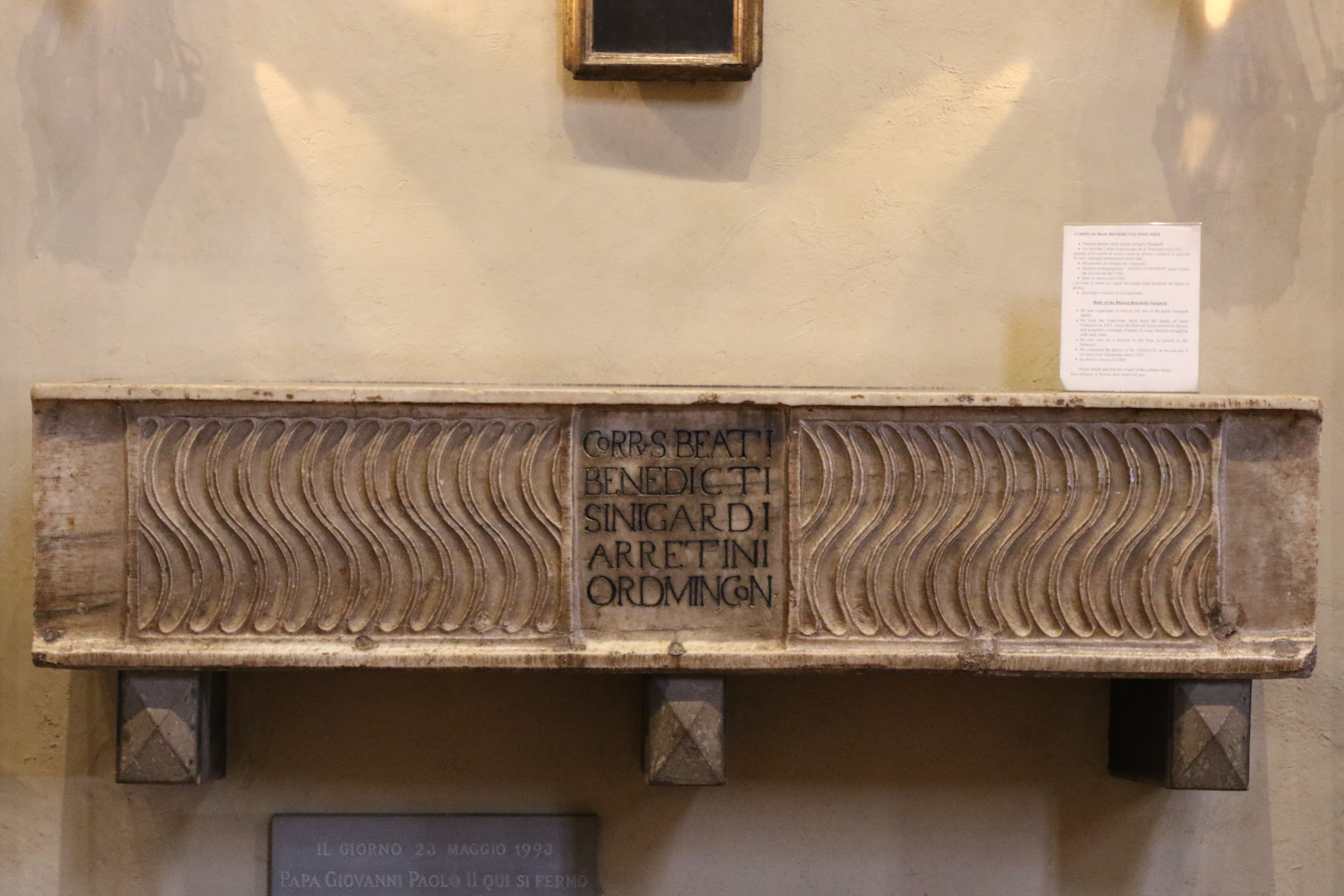
His tomb (a reused Roman sarcophagus) in San Francesco, Arezzo

Benedetto Sinigardi, also known as Fra Benedetto di Arezzo or Sinigardi di Arezzo (1190 - 1282) was a Franciscan friar, and is considered to be the author of the Angelus prayer.

== Life ==
He was the son of Thomas and Elizabeth Sinigardi a noble and wealthy family.

In 1211, after attending a sermon given by Francis of Assisi in the Piazza Grande in Arezzo he decided to enter the order. In 1217 he was appointed Provincial of the Marches and set off a missionary to Greece, Romania and Turkey. In 1221 he arrived in the Holy Land and stayed there 16 years as Provincial.

He returned to Arezzo and spent his last years in the convent of Poggio del Sole (now demolished) where he died in old age. He was buried in the Basilica of San Francesco, Arezzo.

He is considered the author of the Angelus prayer. This tradition found a surprising and authoritative advocate in Pope John Paul II who, on 23 May 1993, prayed at the tomb of Benedetto before reciting the Angelus. He said, amongst other things We are in the place where, according to tradition, was born the custom of reciting the Angelus ...

He is remembered on 13 August each year.
