= The Legend of the True Cross =

15th-century fresco cycle by Piero della Francesca

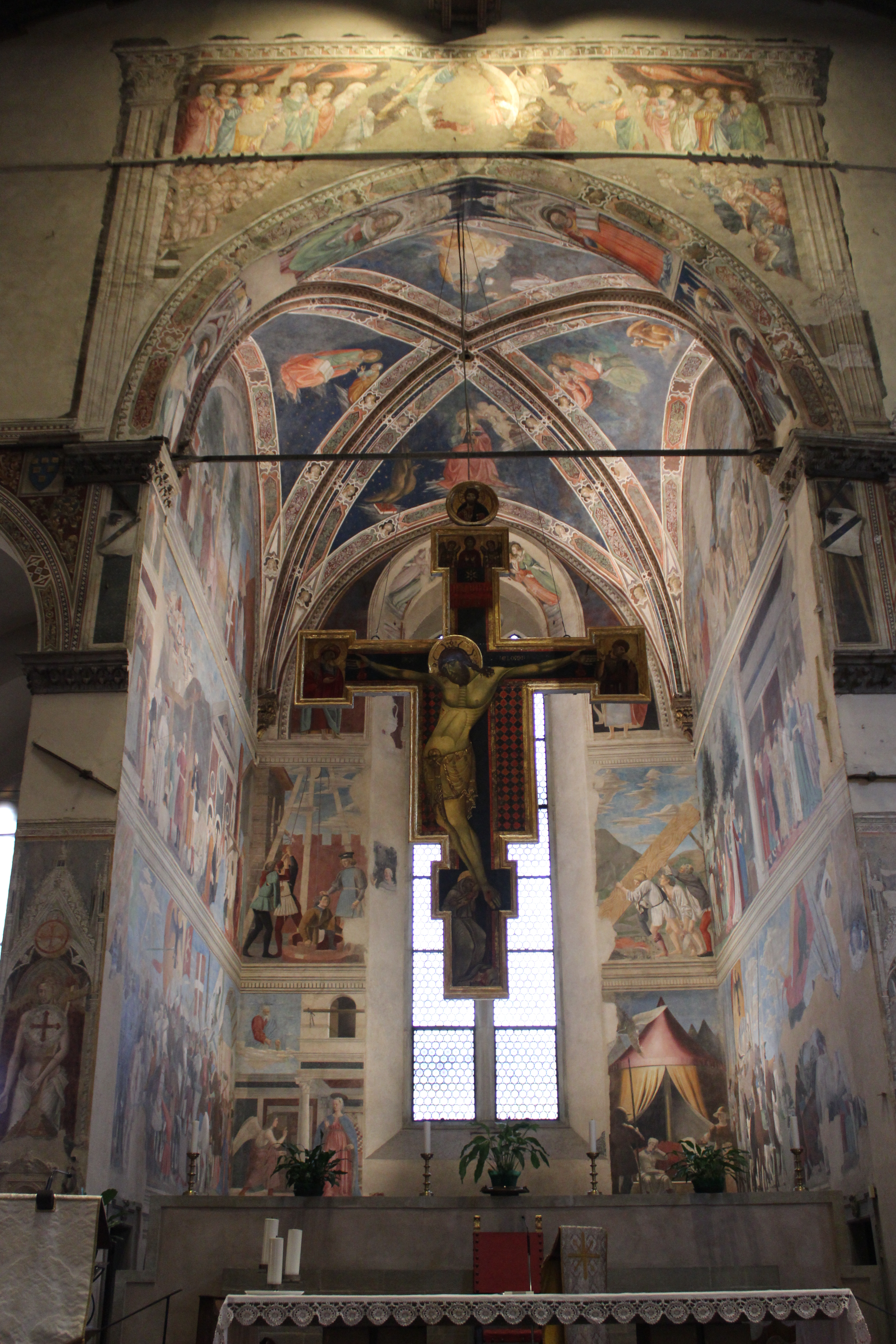
- Artist: Piero della Francesca
- Year: c. 1452–1466
- Type: Fresco
- Location: Basilica of San Francesco; Arezzo

The Legend of the True Cross (Italian: Leggenda della Vera Croce) or The History of the True Cross (Storie della Vera Croce) is a sequence of frescoes painted by Piero della Francesca in the Basilica of San Francesco in Arezzo. It is his largest work, and generally considered one of his finest, and an early Renaissance masterpiece.

Its theme, derived from the popular 13th century book on the lives of saints by Jacobus de Voragine, the Golden Legend, is the triumph of the True Cross – the legend of the wood from the Garden of Eden becoming the Cross on which Jesus Christ was crucified. This work demonstrates Piero's advanced knowledge of perspective and colour, his geometric orderliness and skill in pictorial construction.

== History ==
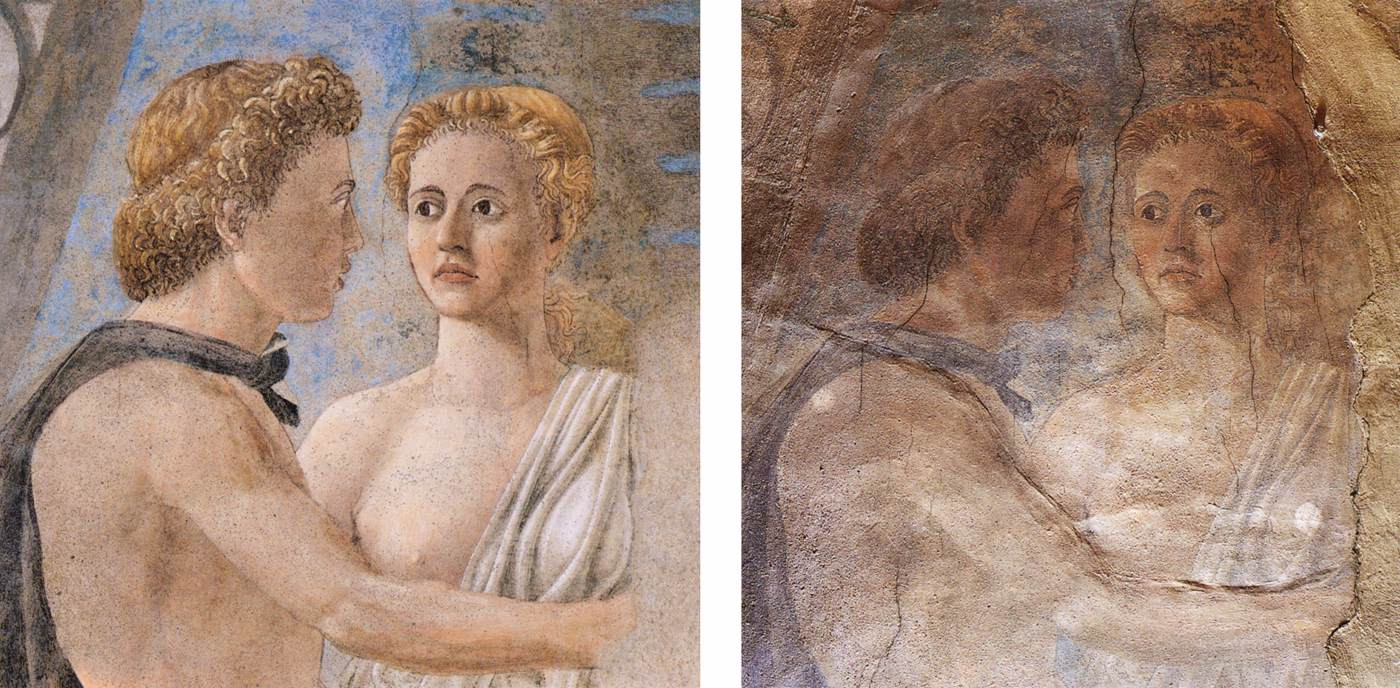
Detail of The Death of Adam after and before restoration

Dating of the frescoes is uncertain, but they are believed to date from after 1447, when the Bacci family, commissioners of the frescoes, are recorded as having paid an unknown painter. It would have been finished around 1466. Most of the choir was painted in the early- to mid-1450s. Although the design of the frescoes is evidently Piero's, he seems to have delegated small parts of the painting to assistants, as was usual. The hand of Giovanni di Piamonte, in particular, can be recognised in some of the frescoes.

An exhaustive restoration began in 1991 and was completed in 2000.

== Episodes ==
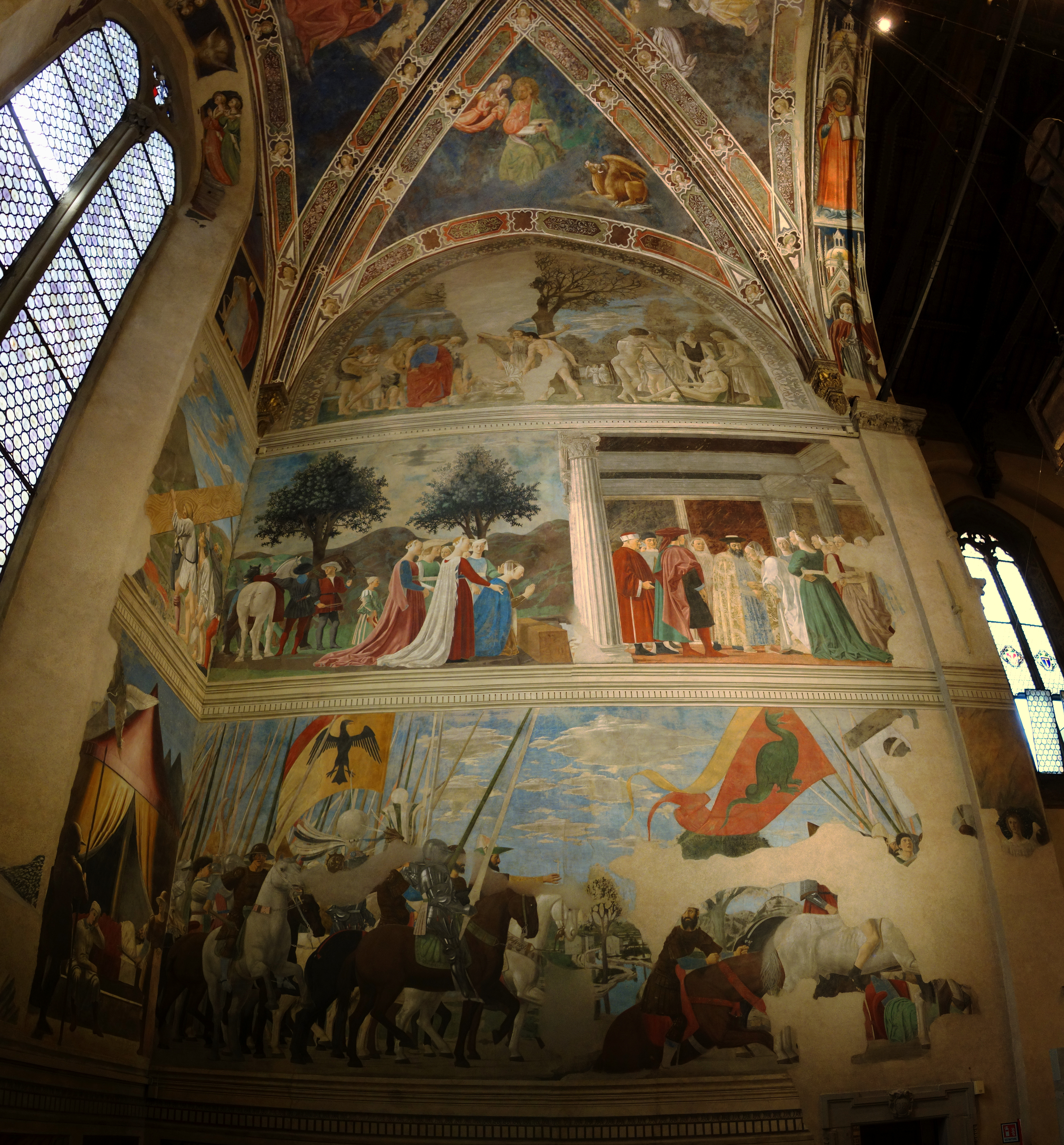
Center, from the top:
- Death of Adam
- Adoration of the Holy Wood and the Meeting of Solomon and the Queen of Sheba
- Battle between Constantine and Maxentius

Left side, from the top:

- Burial of the Wood
- Constantine's Dream

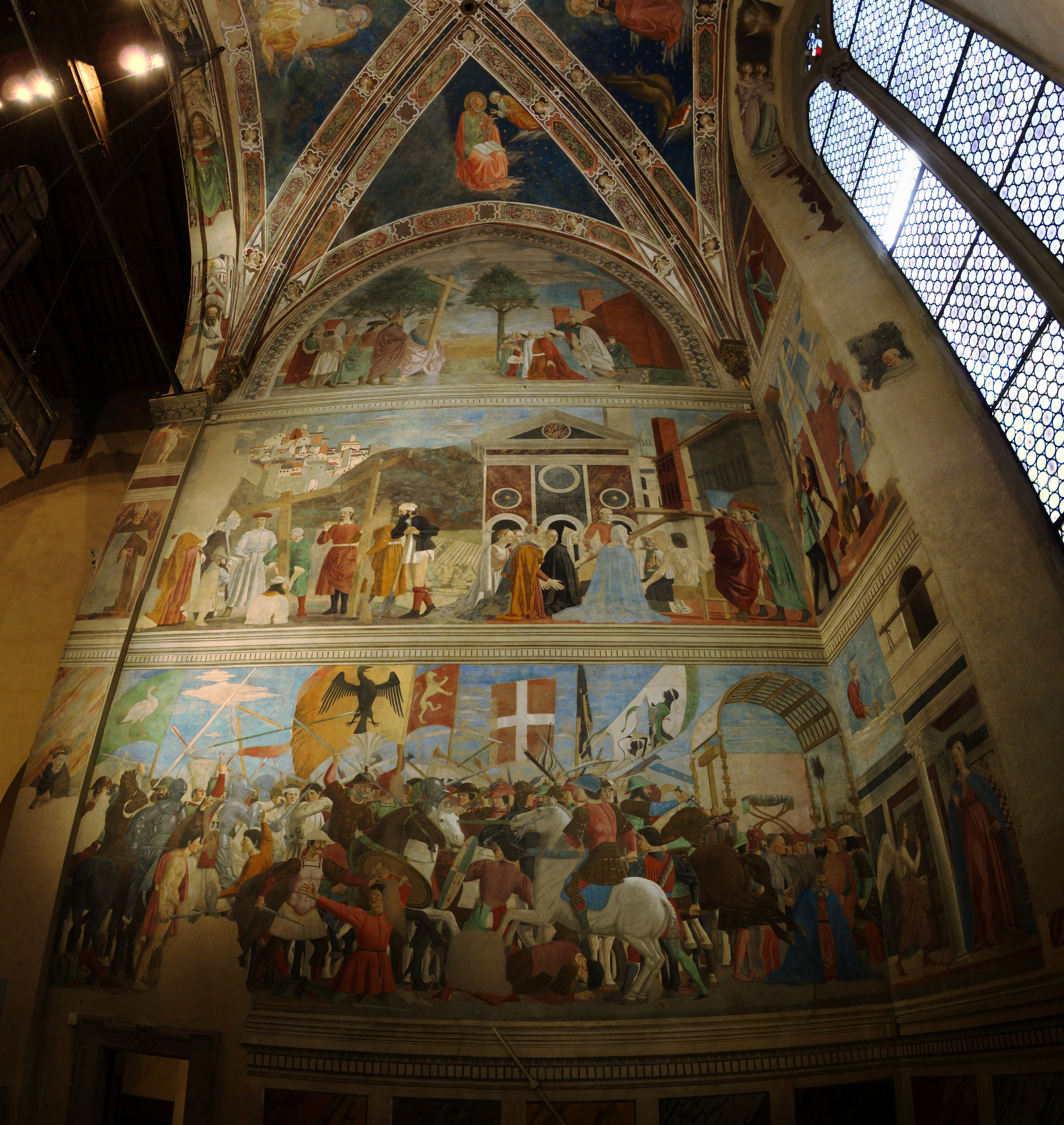
Center, from the top:
- Exaltation of the Cross
- Discovery and Proof of the True Cross
- Battle between Heraclius and Chosroes

Right side, from the top:

- Torture of the Jew
- Annunciation

The main episodes depicted are:

- Death of Adam (390 x 747 cm). According to the legend, the tree from which the cross was made was planted, at the urging of angels, at the burial of Adam by his son, using a branch or a seed from the apple tree of the garden of Eden.
- The Queen of Sheba in Adoration of the Wood and The Meeting of Solomon and the Queen of Sheba (336 x 747 cm). According to the legend, the Queen of Sheba worshiped the beams made from the tree, and informed Solomon that the Saviour would hang from that tree, and thus dismember the realm of the Jews. This caused Solomon to hew it down and bury it, until it was found by the Romans.
- Constantine's Dream (329 x 190 cm) Emperor Constantine the Great, before the battle of Milvian Bridge, is awakened by an angel who shows him the cross in heaven. With the cross on his shield, he slew the enemy, and later converted to Christianity.
- Discovery and Proof of the True Cross (356 x 747 cm). Helena, Constantine's mother, finds the cross in Jerusalem. It was not easy to get information and "when the queen had called them and demanded them the place where our Lord Jesus Christ had been crucified, they would never tell... her. Then commanded she to burn them all" or cast them into a dry pit for seven days and there torment them with hunger. The Jew is shown in one fresco being pulled from the pit by a rope, whereupon he confessed that Jesus was his lord and where the cross was located. The proof of the cross was that it was used to resurrect a dead man.

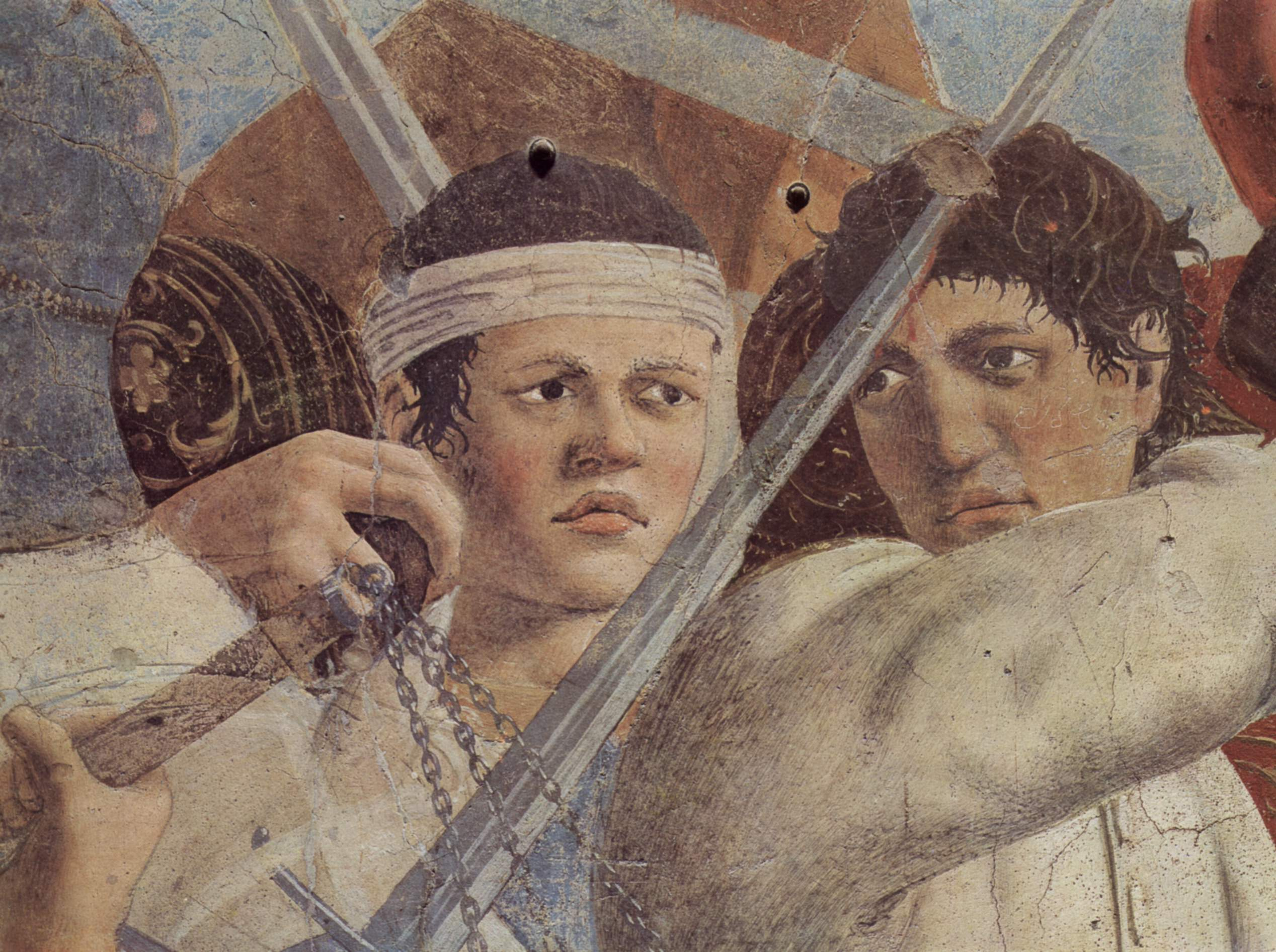
Detail of Battle between Heraclius and Khosrau.

- Battle between Heraclius and Khosrau (329 x 747 cm). The cross played a role in battles during the war between the Eastern Roman Empire and the Sassanid Empire (early 7th century).
- Exaltation of the Cross (390 x 747 cm).

Piero diverged from his source material in a few important respects, including the story of King Solomon's meeting with the Queen of Sheba in a chronologically inaccurate place and giving greater emphasis to the two battles in which Christianity triumphs over paganism.

The cycle ends with a depiction of the Annunciation, not strictly part of the Legend of the True Cross but probably included by Piero for its universal meaning.

== Video showing music and frescoes ==
For the 2010 Martinů Festival in Basel (Switzerland) the Swiss author Arthur Spirk presented a video using the CD-Music by the Orchestre National de France conducted by James Conlon in 1991 of Bohuslav Martinů's symphonic work about the frescoes together with detailed photographs of the frescoes.

== Bibliography ==
- Belton, Robert, and Kersten, Bernd (2010). "Vision and Visions in Piero della Francesca’s Legend of the True Cross, excerpt in Glimpse Journal Blog
- Cole, Bruce (1991). Piero della Francesca: Tradition and Innovation in Renaissance Art, pp. 84-117, HarperCollins Publishers.
- The Elene of Cynewulf. Yale Studies in English. Vol. XXI (1904). Translated into English prose by Lucius Hudson Holt. In Project Gutenberg.
- Lavin, Marilyn Aronberg (1994). Piero della Francesca: San Francesco, Arezzo, New York: George Braziller.
- Maetzke, Anna Maria, ed. (2000), Piero della Francesca: The Legend of the True Cross in the Church of San Francesco in Arezzo, with Giovanna Melandri, Stefano Casciu, and Carla Corsi. Skira. ISBN 88-8118-829-5.
- Maetzke, Anna Maria; Bertelli, Carlo, eds. (2001), Piero della Francesca: The Legend of the True Cross in the Church of San Francesco in Arezzo, texts by Marilyn Aronberg Lavin et al. Skira. ISBN 978-8884910233.
- Turner, Jane Shoaf, ed. (2002). The Dictionary of Art, Grove
