= Rucellai Sepulchre =

Funerary chapel in Florence

- Tempietto del Santo Sepolcro
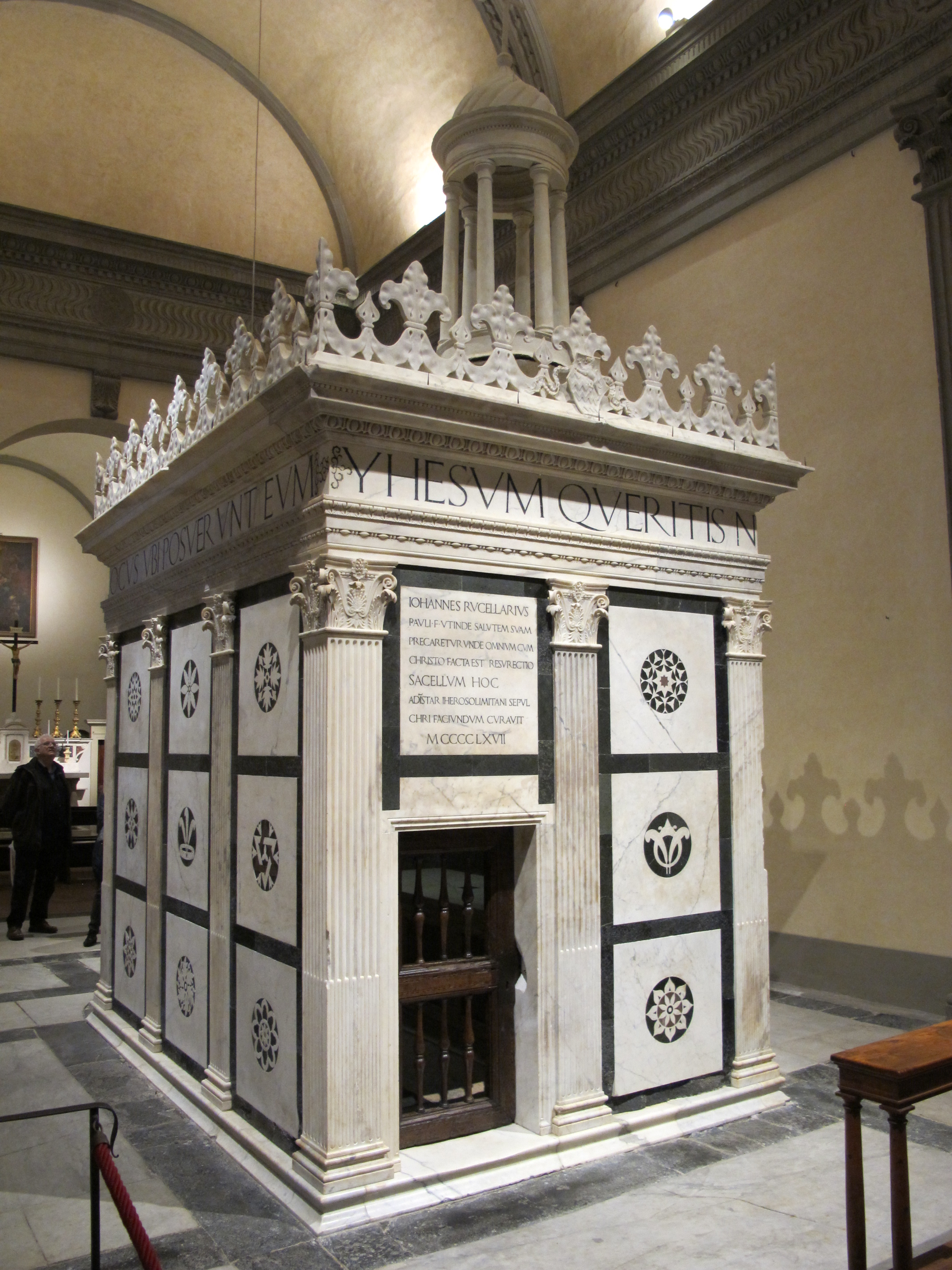
- Interactive map of the Rucellai Sepulchre area
- Alternative names: Sacellum of the Holy Sepulchre; Chapel of the Holy Sepulchre; Tempietto del Santo Sepolcro; Sacello del Santo Sepolcro; Tempietto Rucellai

General information
- Type: funerary chapel
- Architectural style: Renaissance
- Location: Rucellai Chapel, San Pancrazio, Florence, Italy
- Coordinates: 43.77196°N 11.24990°E
- Construction started: about 1458
- Completed: 1467

Design and construction
- Architect: Leon Battista Alberti

The Rucellai Sepulchre is a small funerary chapel built inside the Rucellai Chapel of the church of San Pancrazio, Florence. It was commissioned by Giovanni di Paolo Rucellai and built to designs by Leon Battista Alberti in imitation or emulation of the Holy Sepulchre in the Anastasis in Jerusalem. It contains the tombs of Giovanni Rucellai and members of his family.

== Names ==
The Rucellai sepulchre is known by various names, including Sacellum of the Holy Sepulchre, Chapel of the Holy Sepulchre, Italian: Tempietto del Santo Sepolcro, Sacello del Santo Sepolcro and Tempietto Rucellai.

== History ==
Leon Battista Alberti probably began work on the Rucellai Chapel and on the sepulchre within it in about 1458; the origins of the chapel date to 1417, when the walls of the nave of San Pancrazio were built. According to the inscription above the door, the Sepulchre was completed in 1467.

The Rucellai Chapel was closed for many years for restoration. Since 16 February 2013 it has been re-opened to the public. Access is through the Marino Marini Museum, which occupies the deconsecrated part of the church of San Pancrazio.

== Description ==
=== Exterior ===
==== Inscriptions ====
The sepulchre has two inscriptions: one, on a square panel above the door, reads:

IOHANNES RVCELLARIVS
PAVLI ‧F‧ VT INDE SALVTEM SVAM
PRECARETVR VNDE OMNIVM CVM
CHRISTO FACTA EST RESVRECTIO
SACELLVM HOC
ADĪSTAR HIEROSOLIMITANI SEPVL
CHRI FACIVNDVM CVRAVIT
MCCCCLXVII

meaning approximately "Giovanni di Paolo Rucellai, in order that his salvation might be prayed for from where, through Christ, the resurrection of all was achieved, had this temple built in the shape of the tomb in Jerusalem [in] 1467".

The other inscription runs round the top of the building and reads:

YHESVM QVERITIS NAZARENVM CRVCIFIXVM SURREXIT NON EST HIC ECCE LOCVS VBI POSVERVNT EVM

or approximately "you seek Jesus of Nazareth who was crucified; he rose, he is not here; this is the place where they put him".

==== Decorative panels ====
The exterior walls are decorated with 30 square panels of marble inlay work, with mainly vegetal and geometrical patterns.

==== Gallery ====
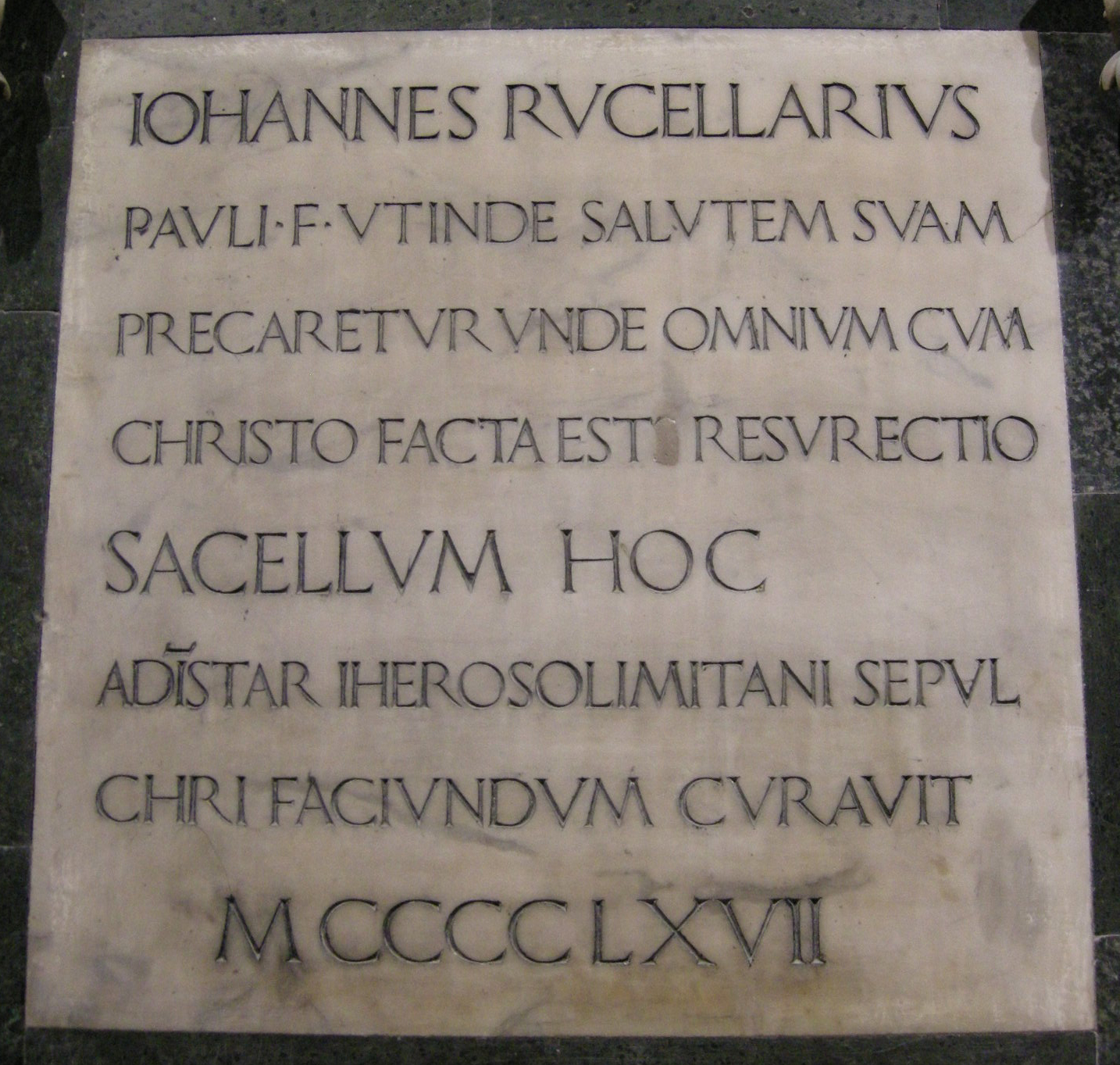
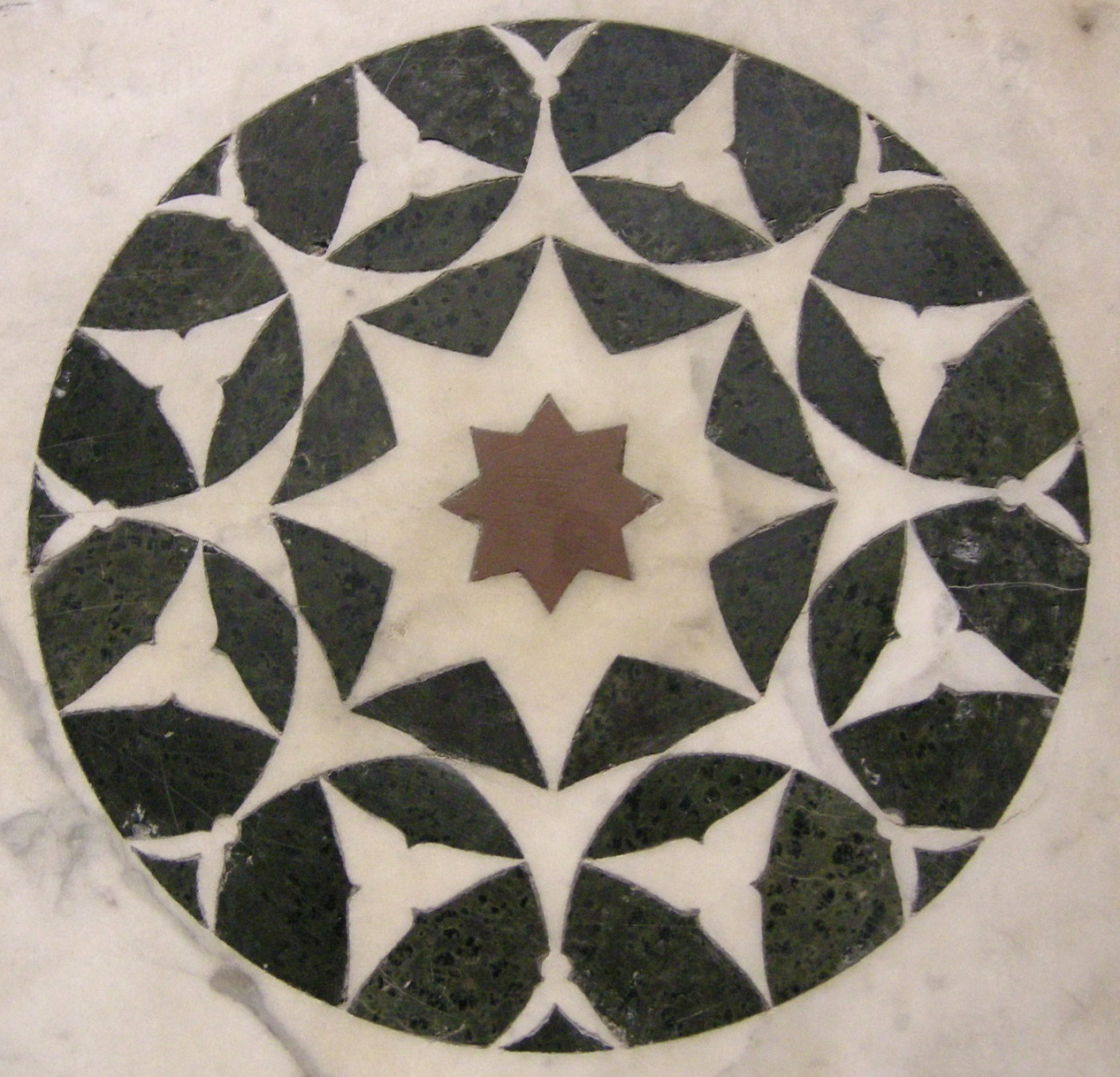
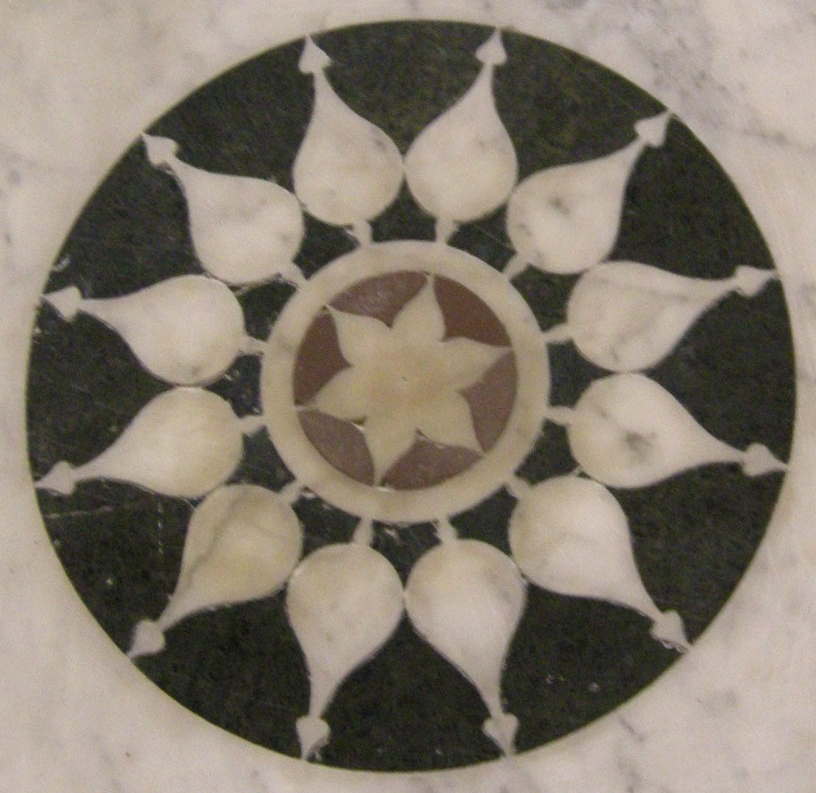
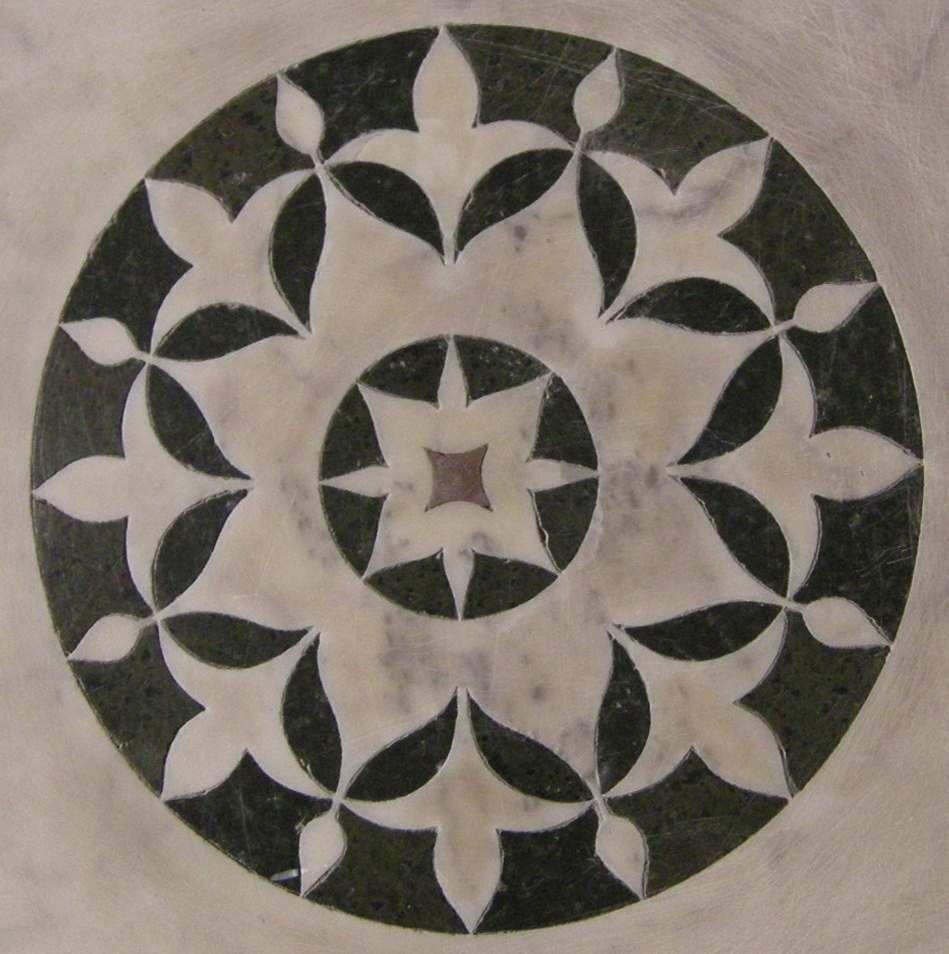
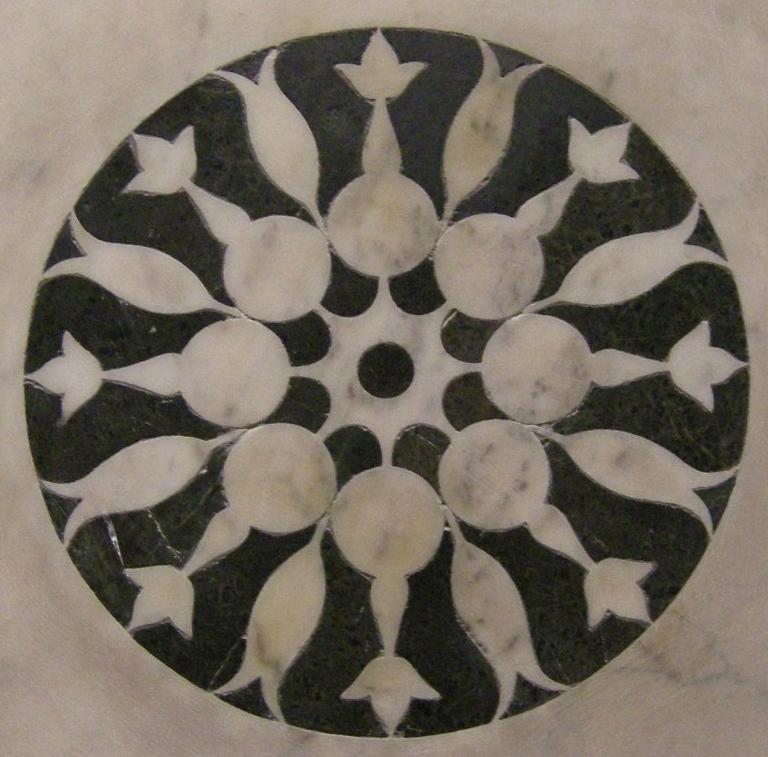
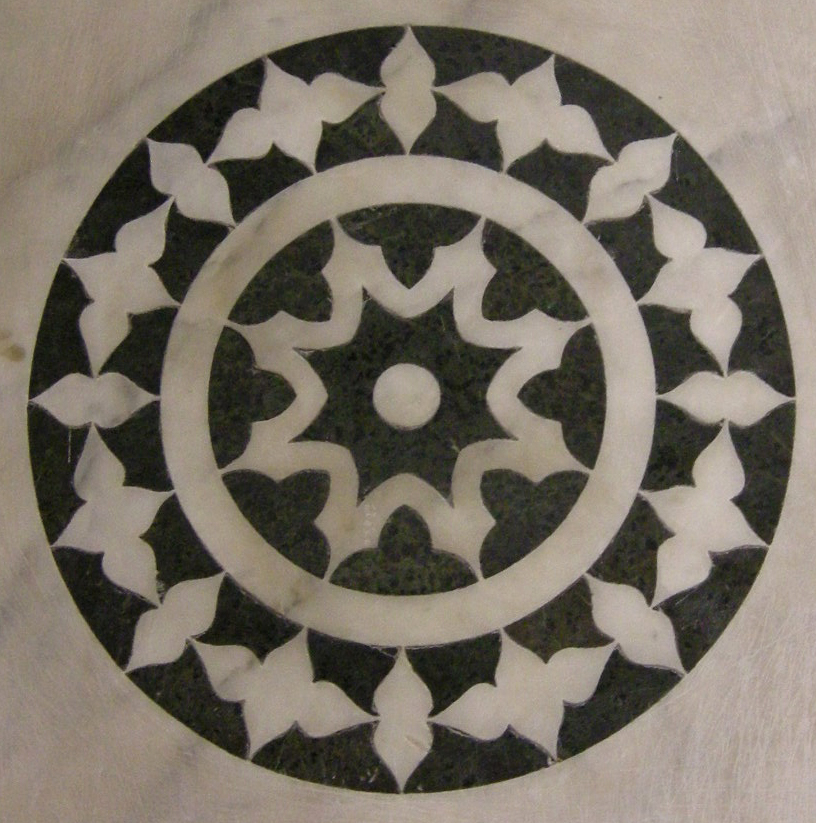
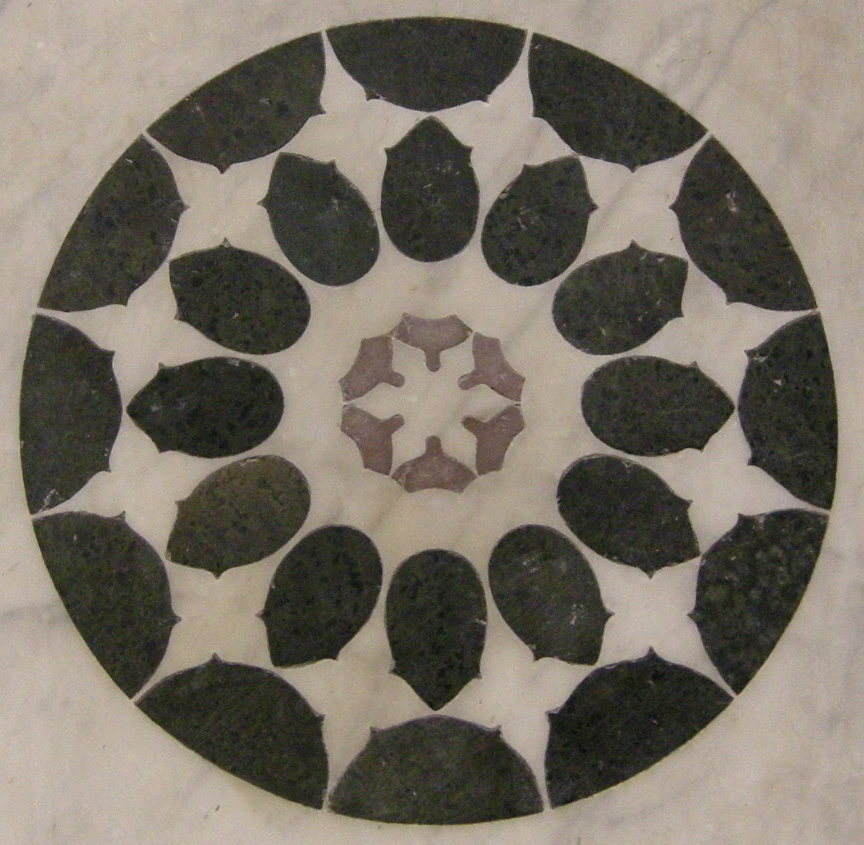
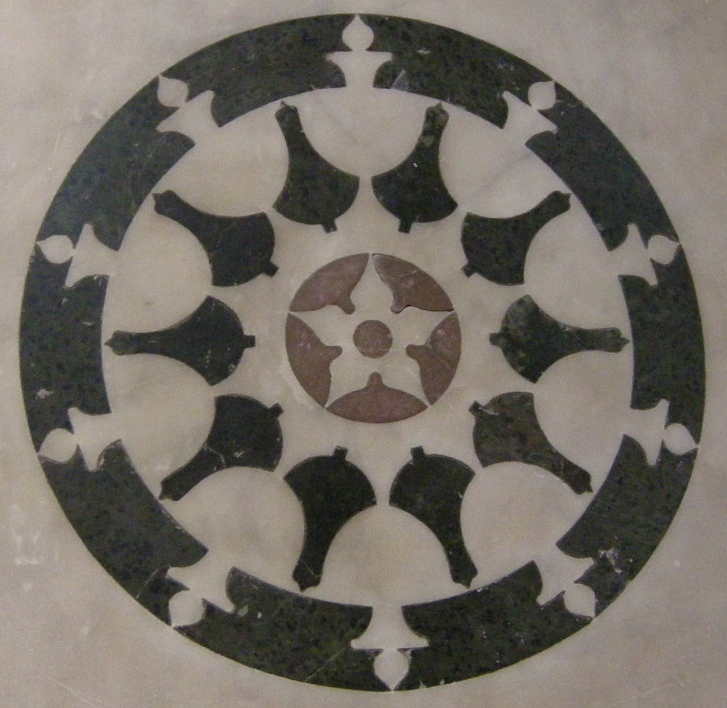
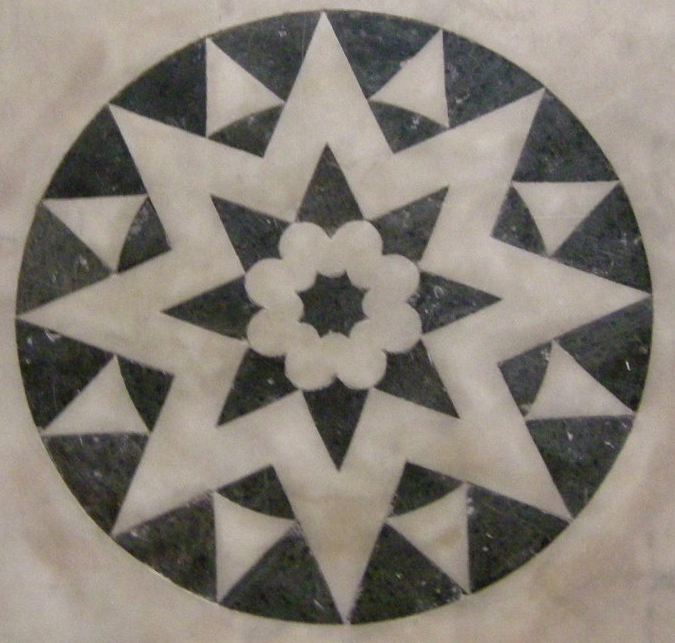
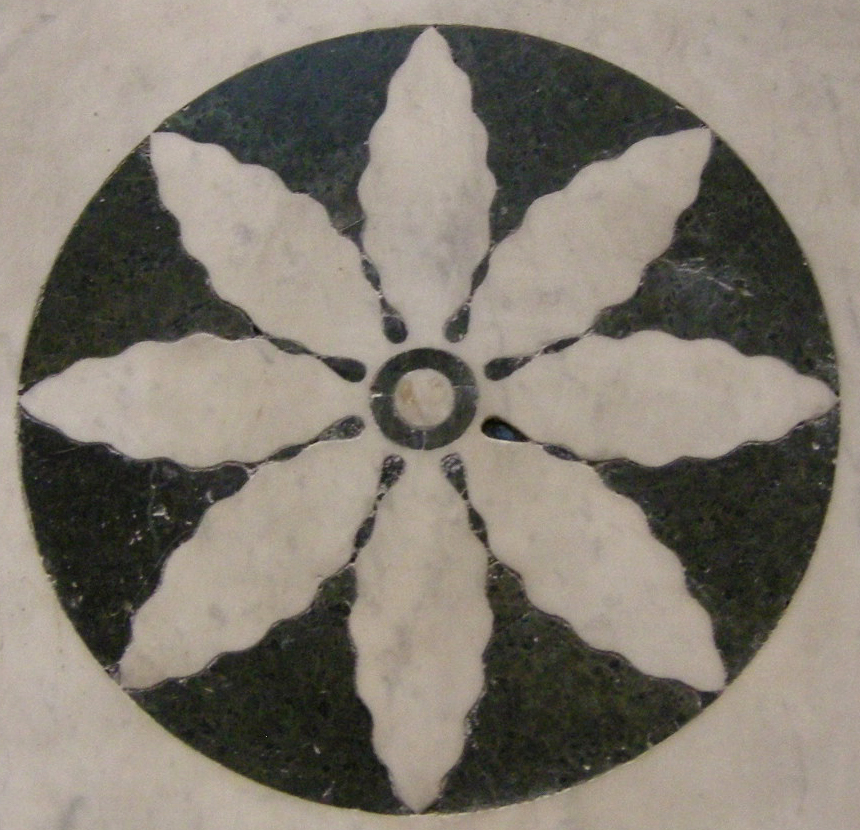
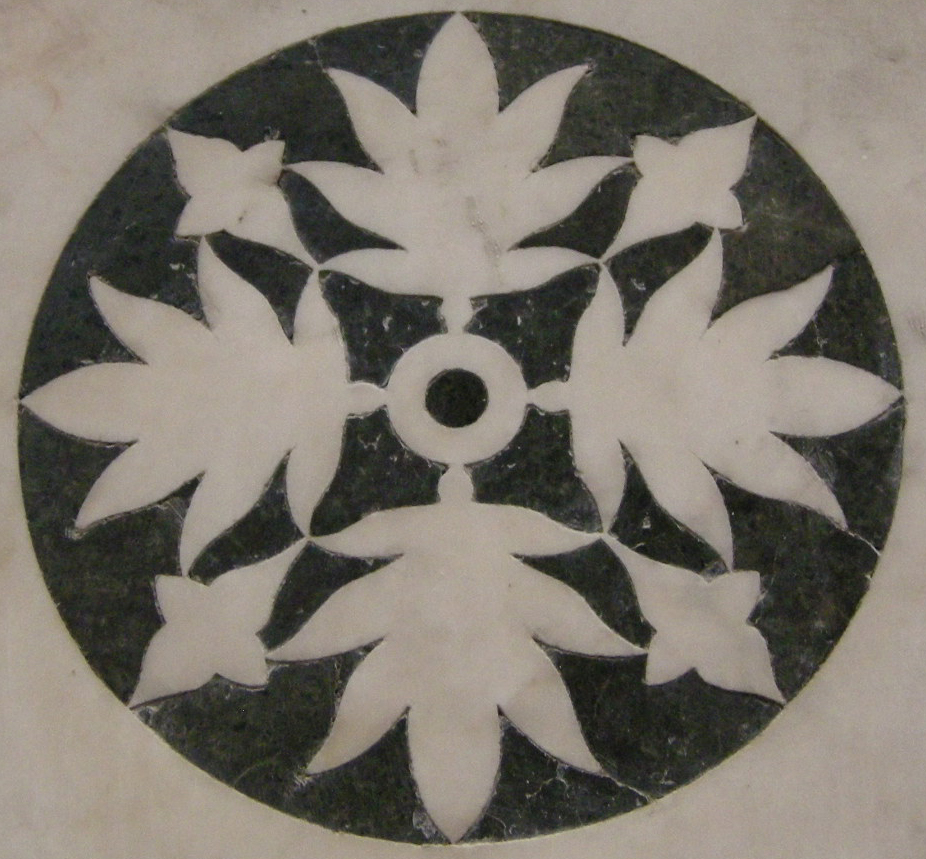
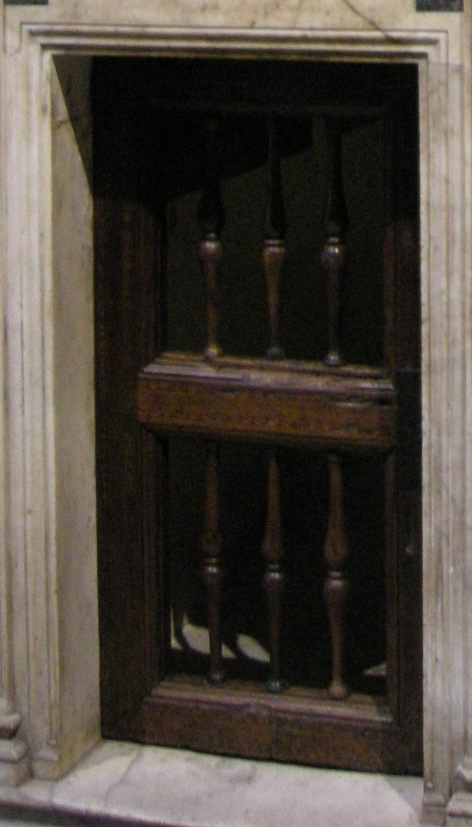
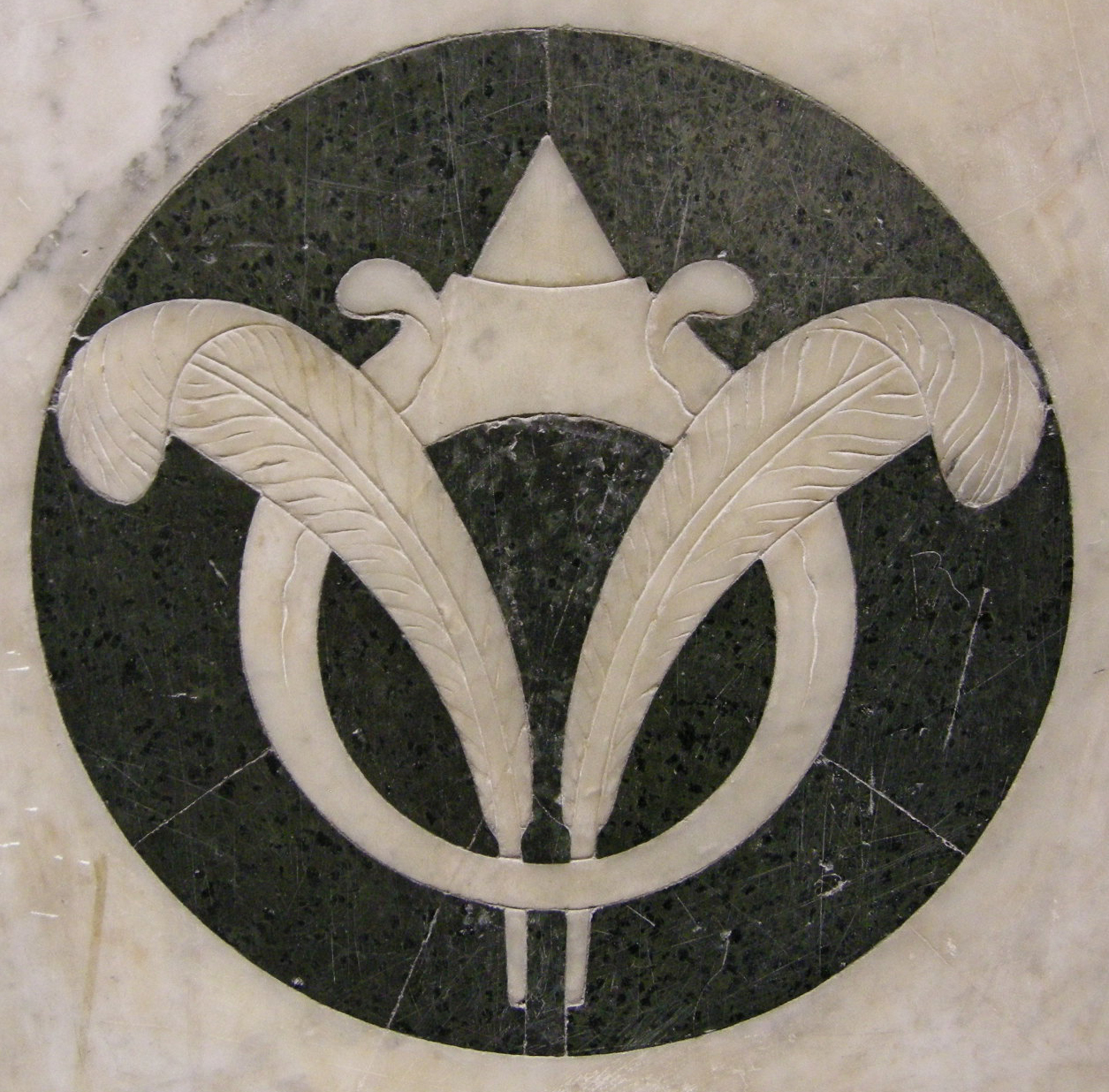
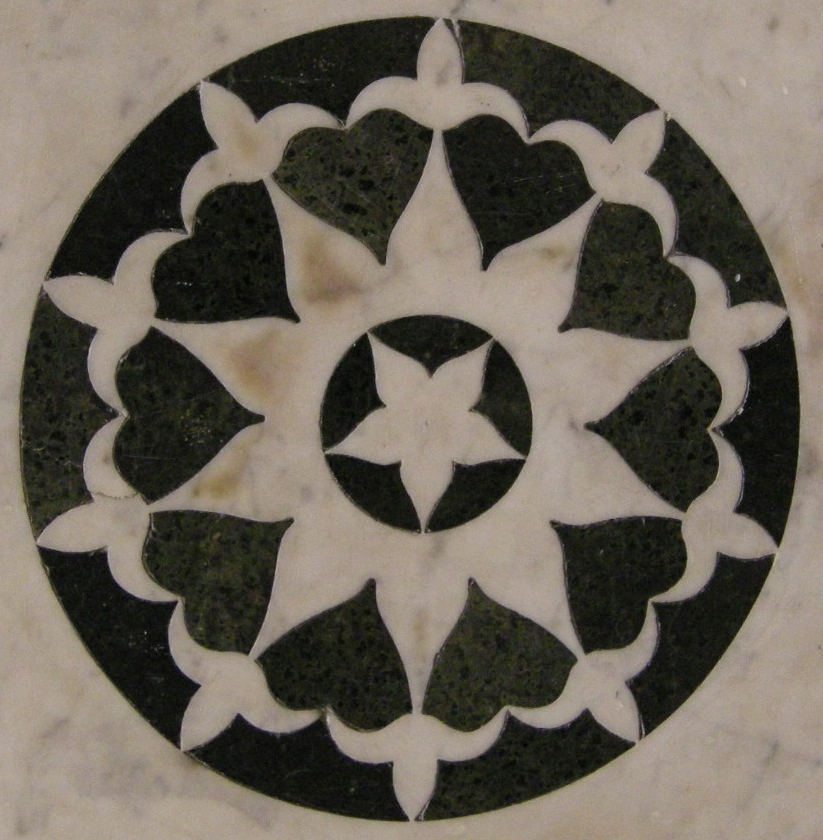
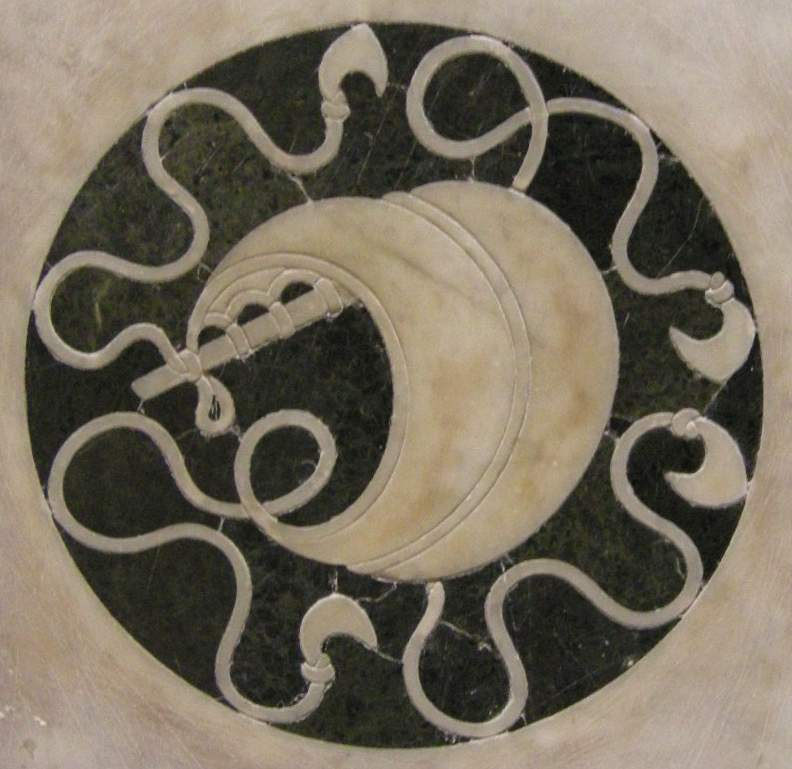
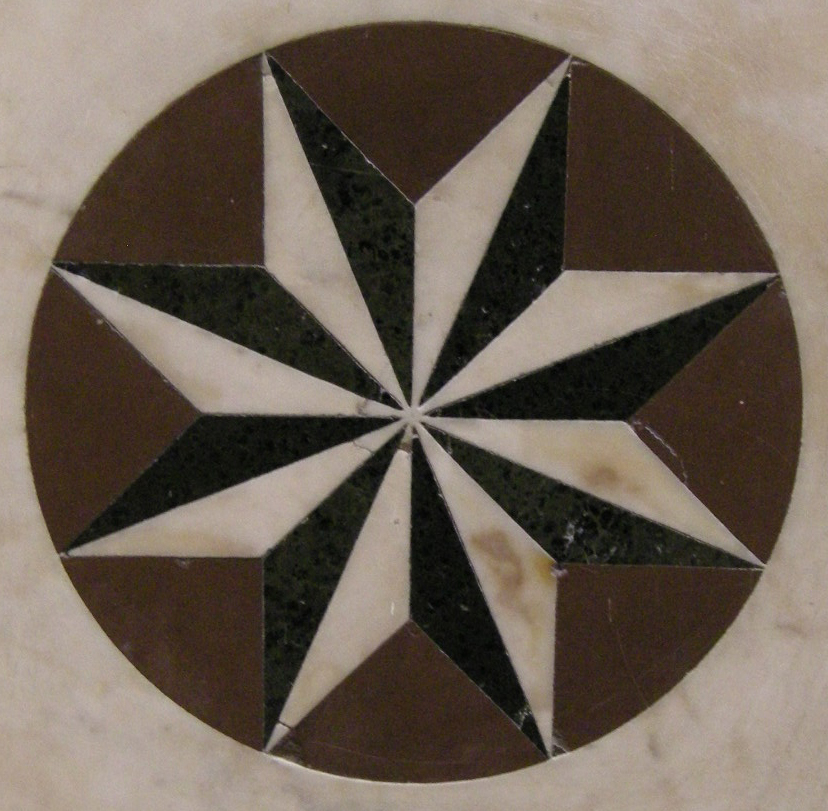
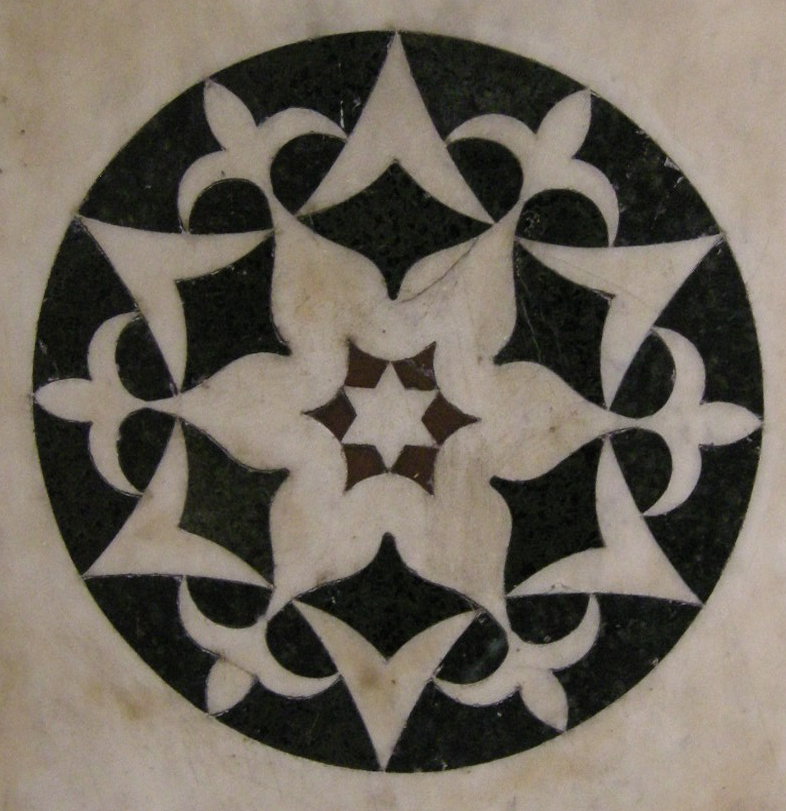
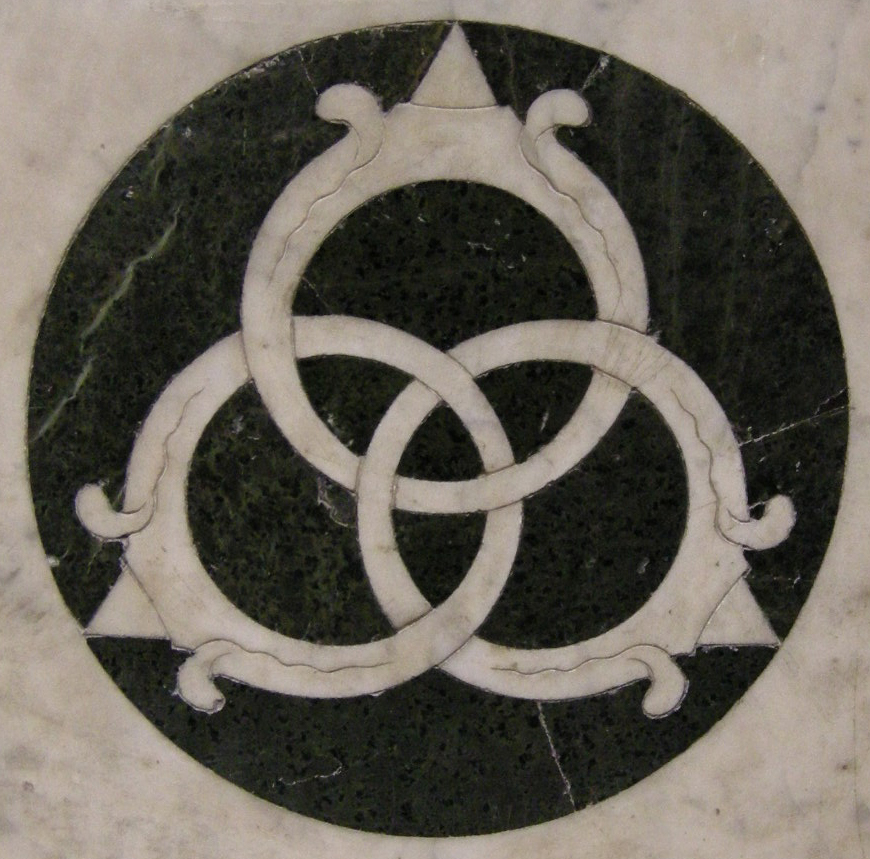
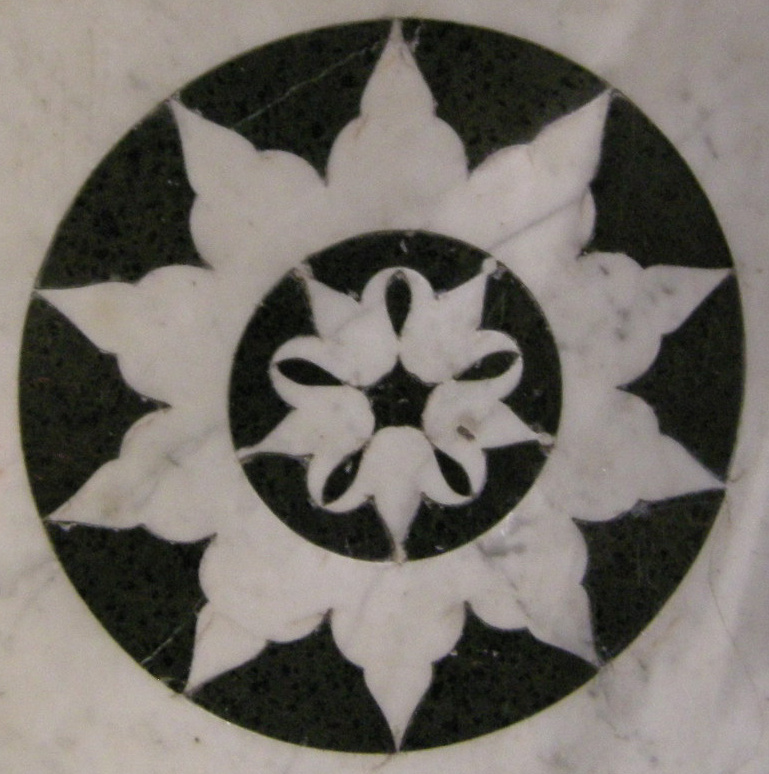
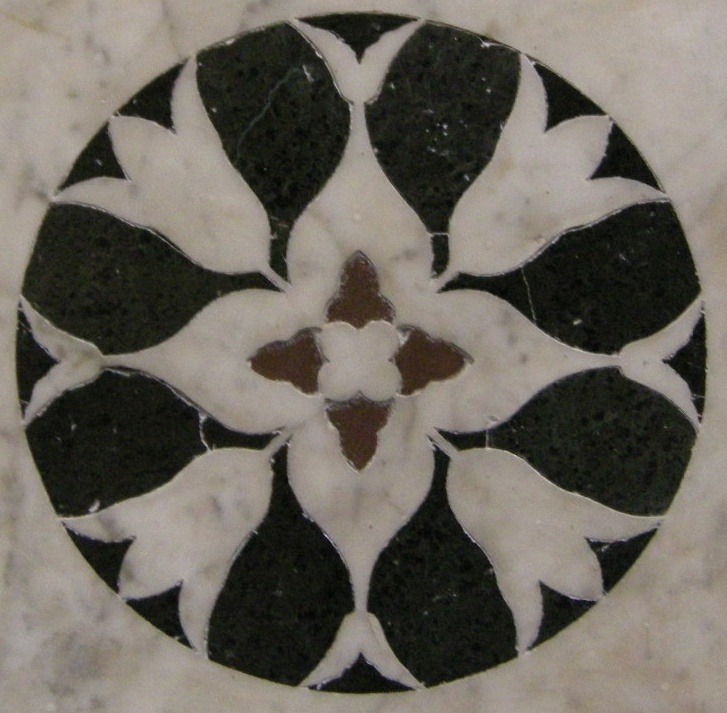
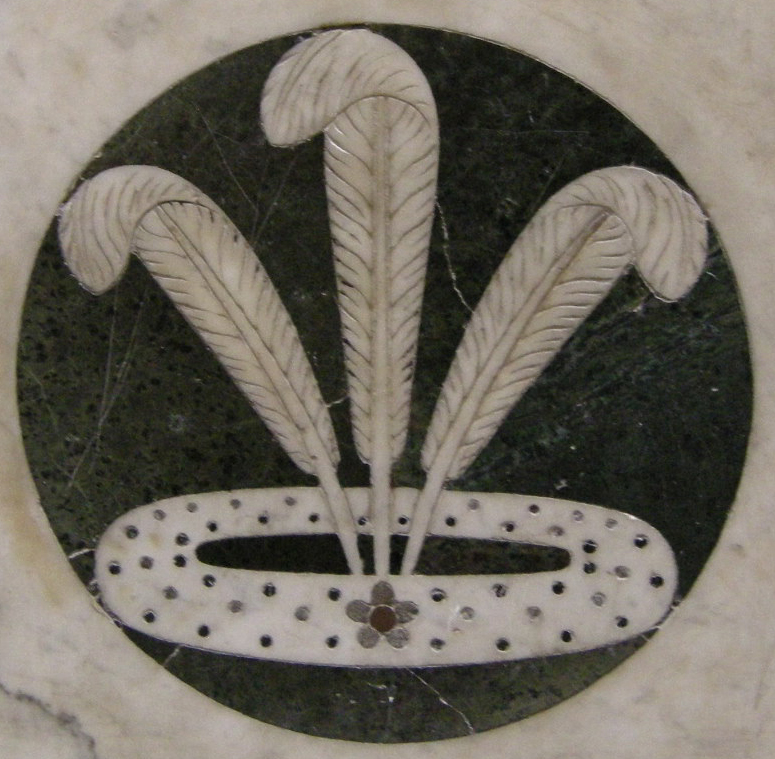
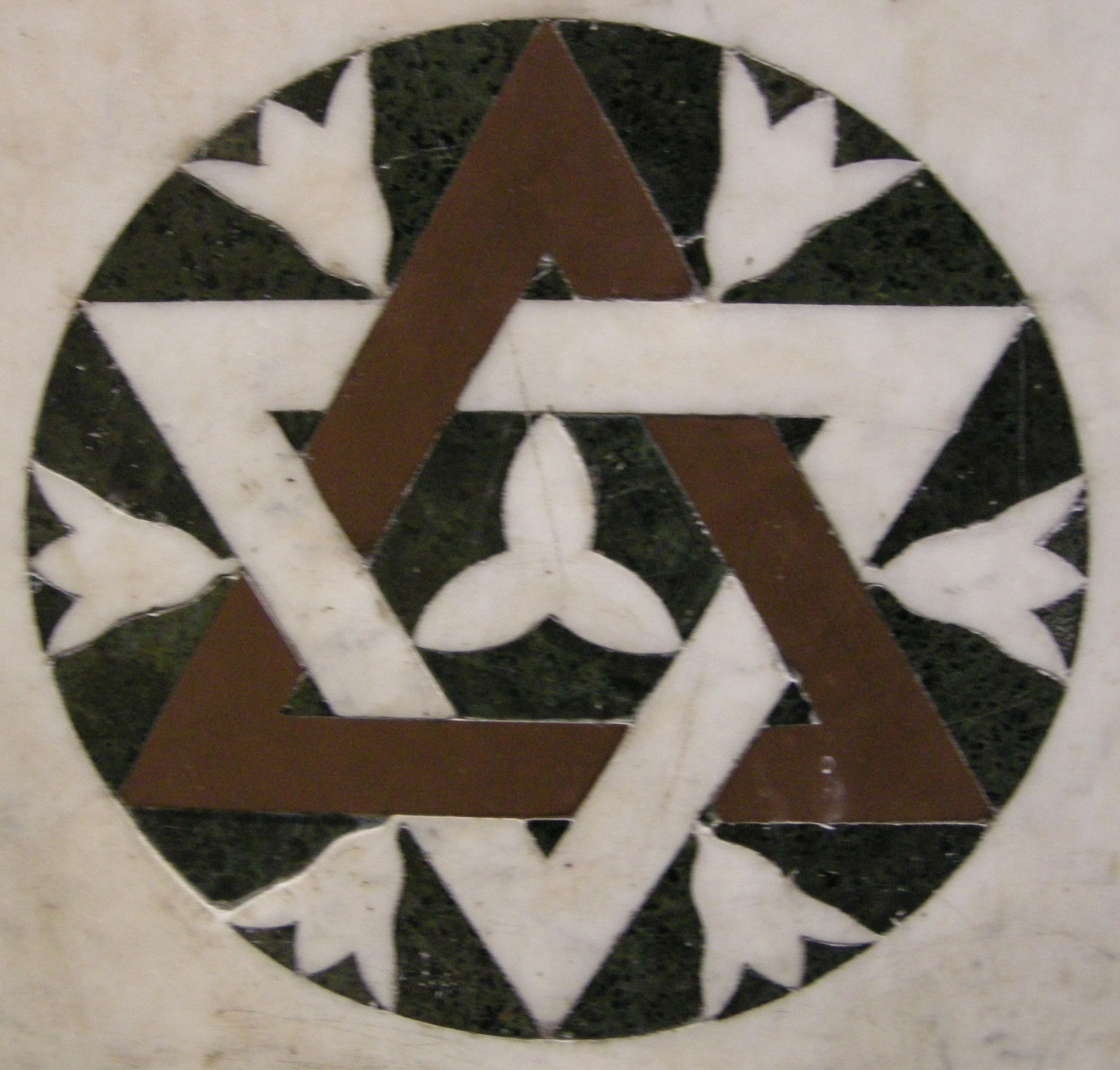
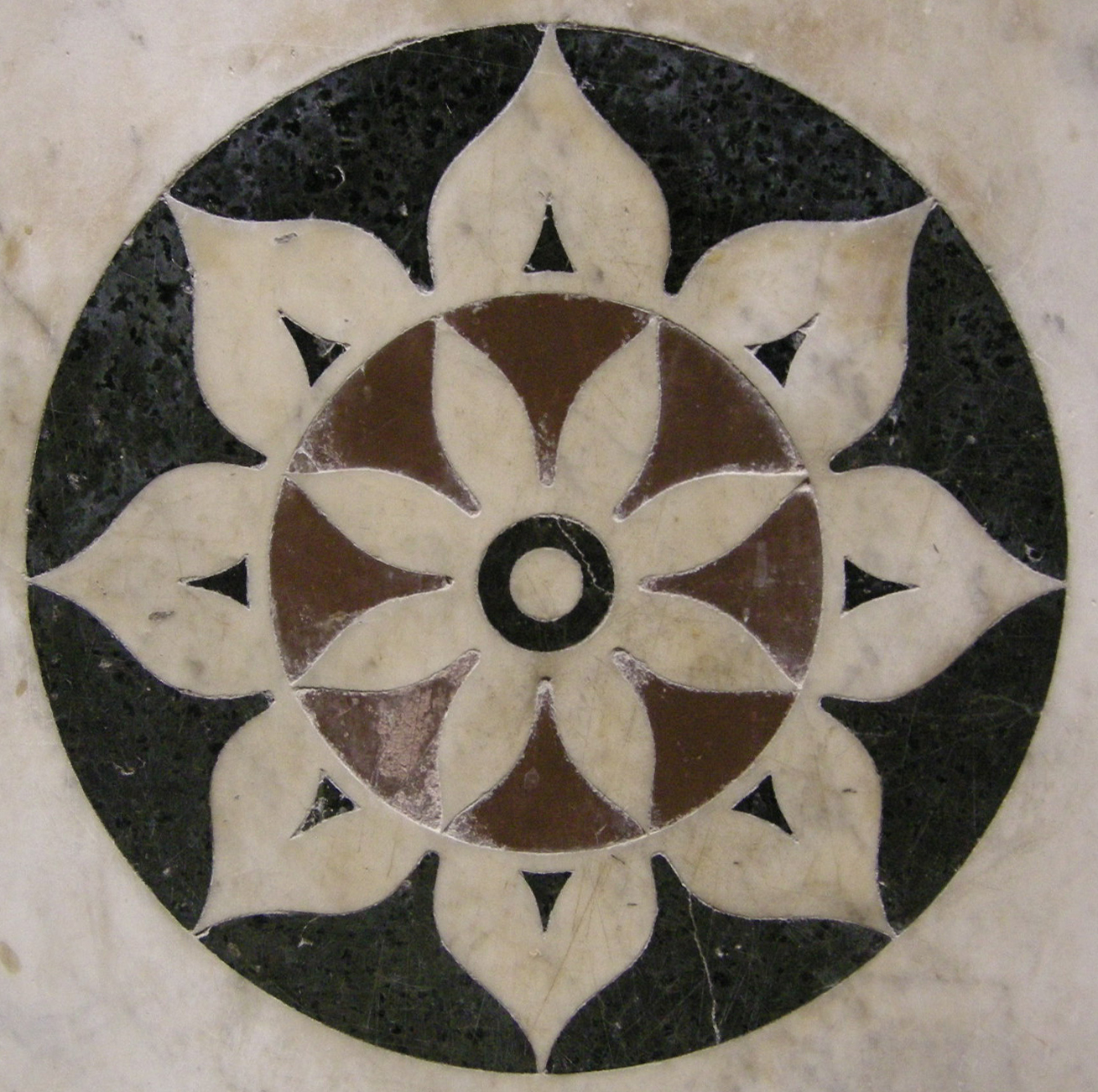
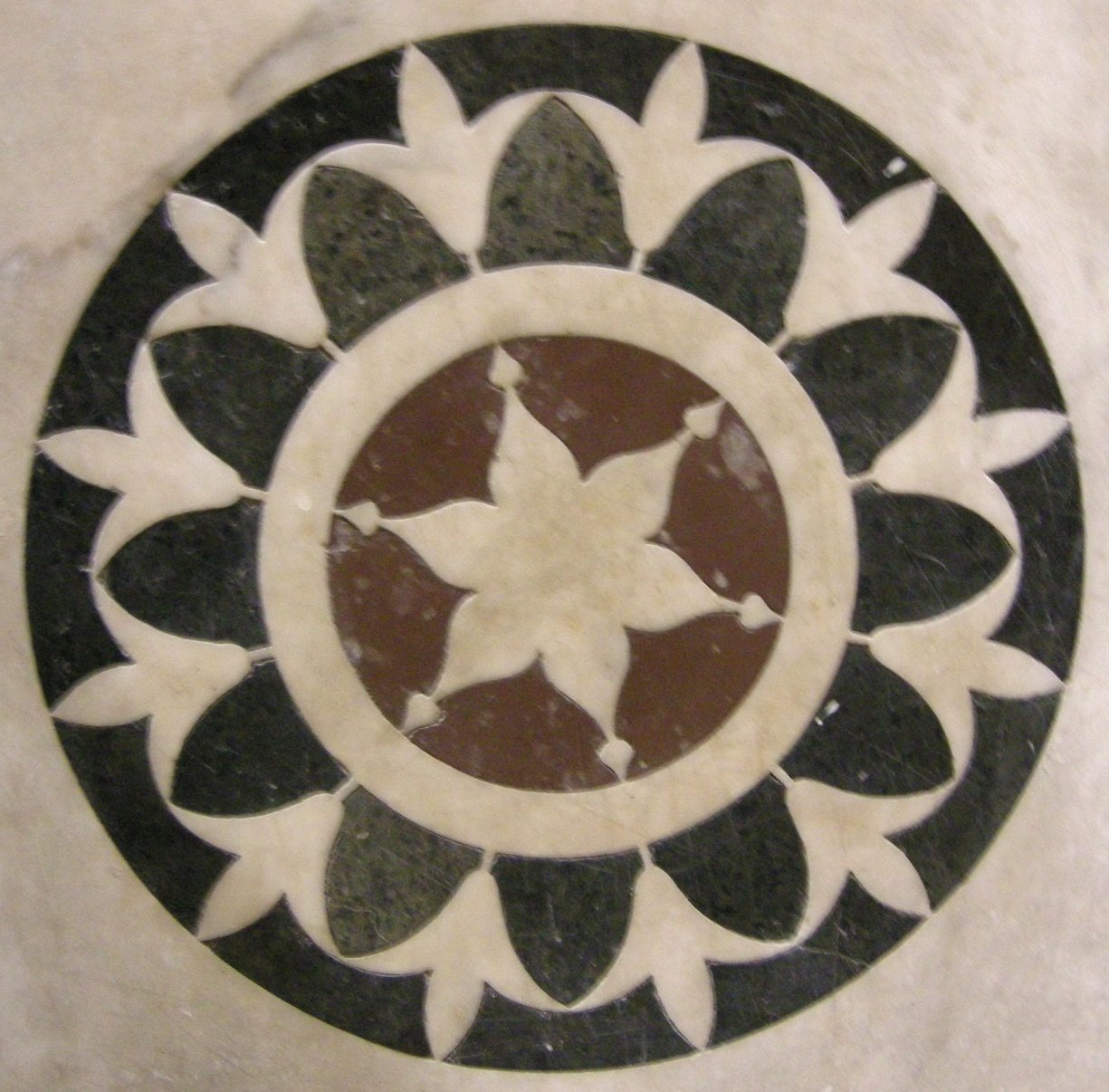
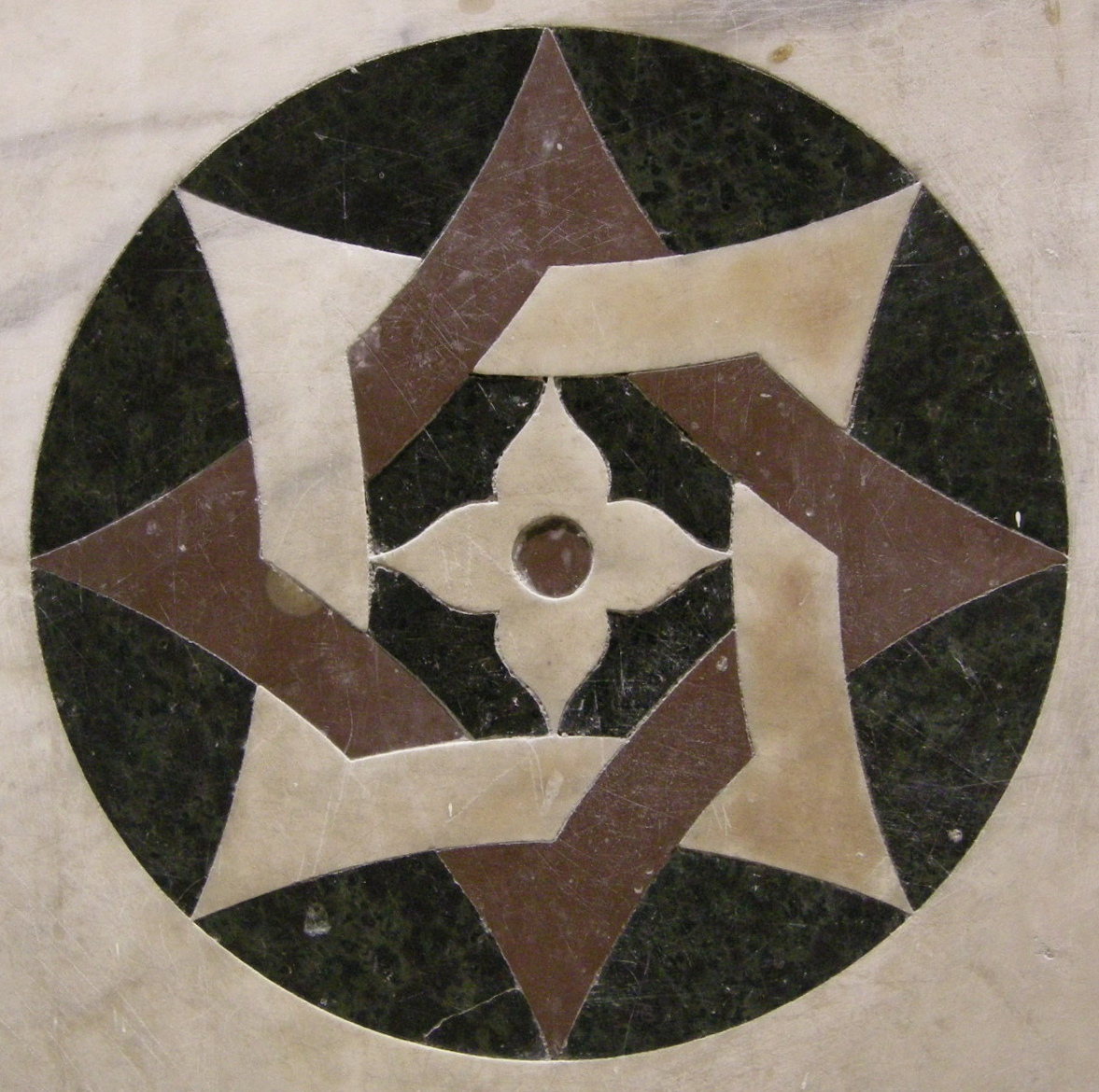
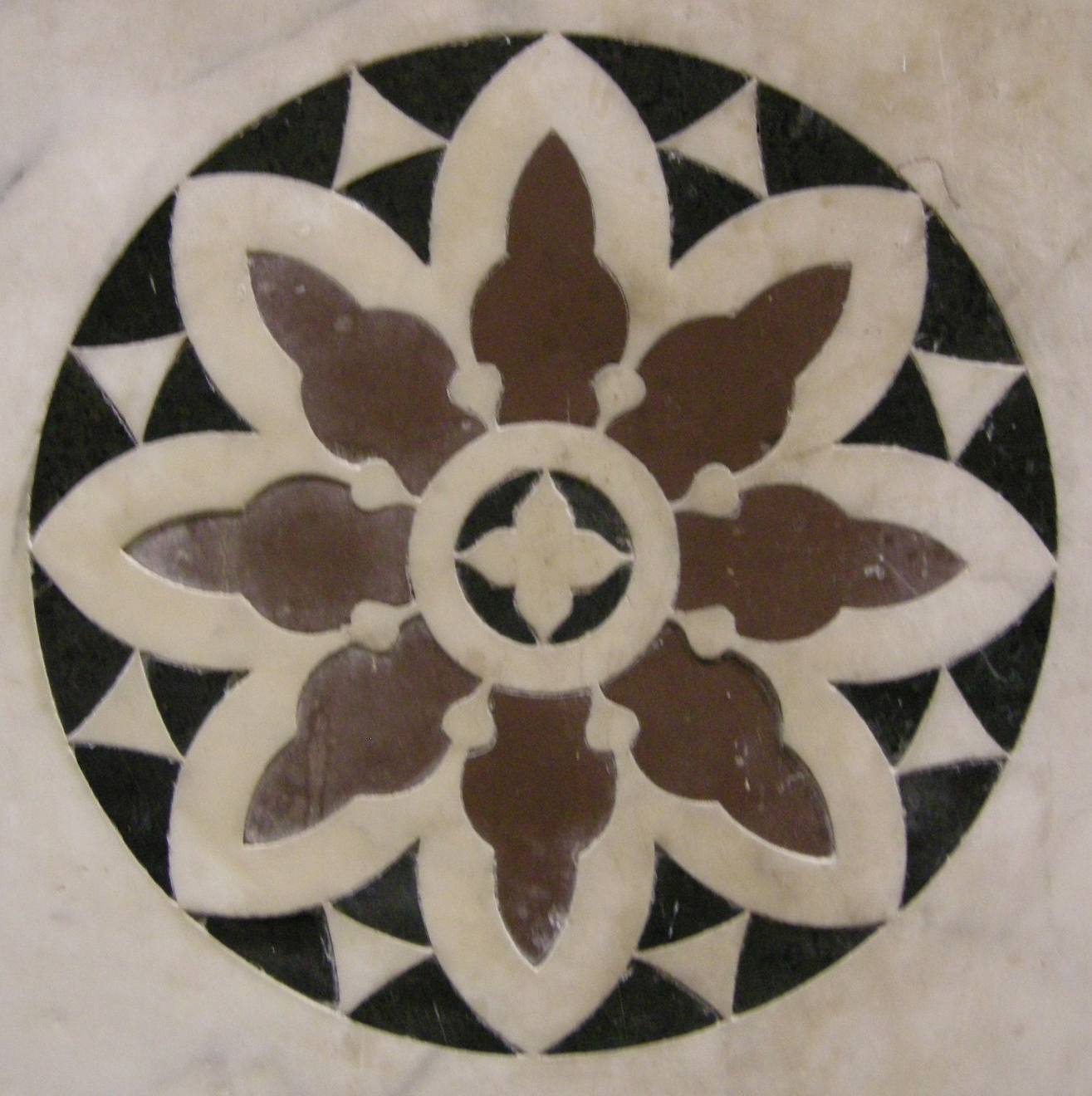
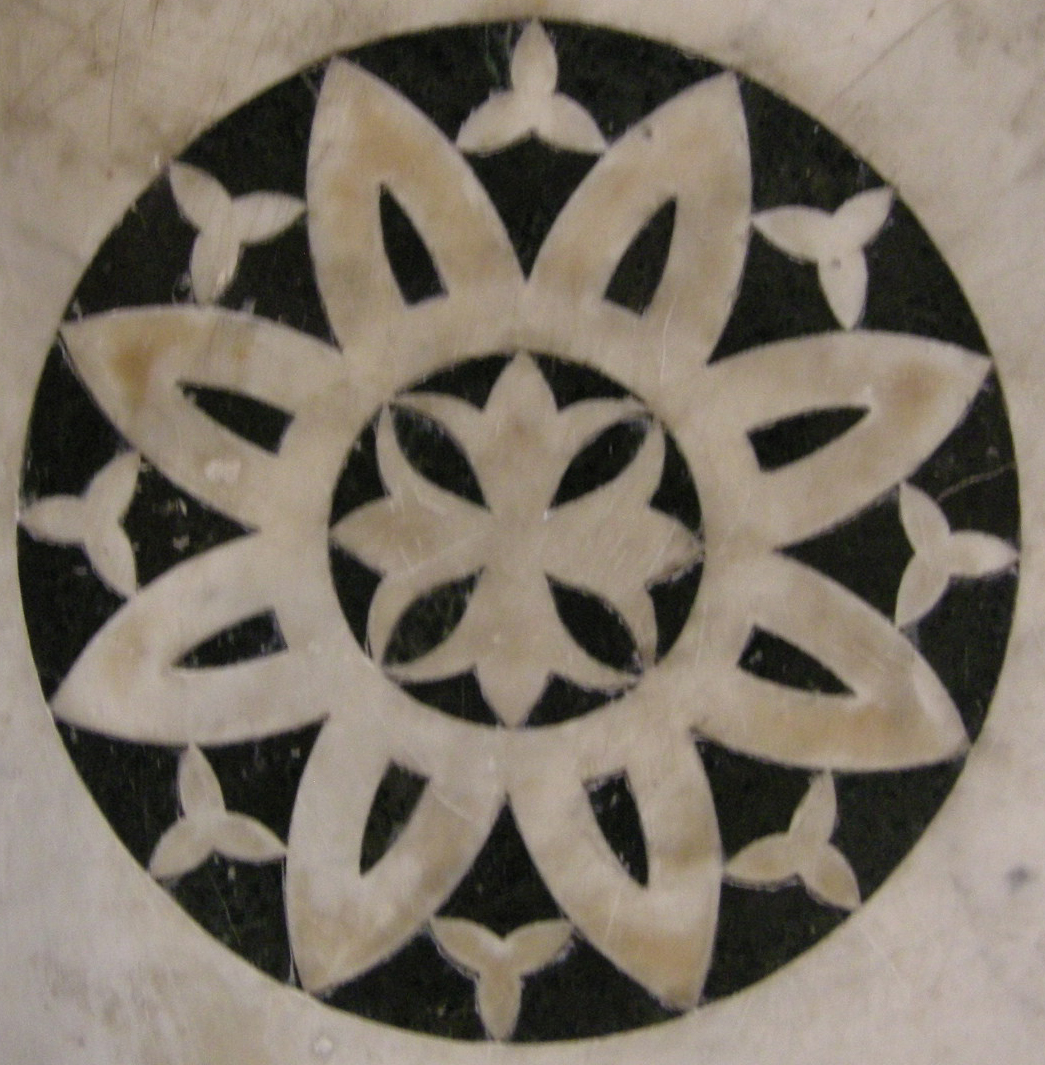
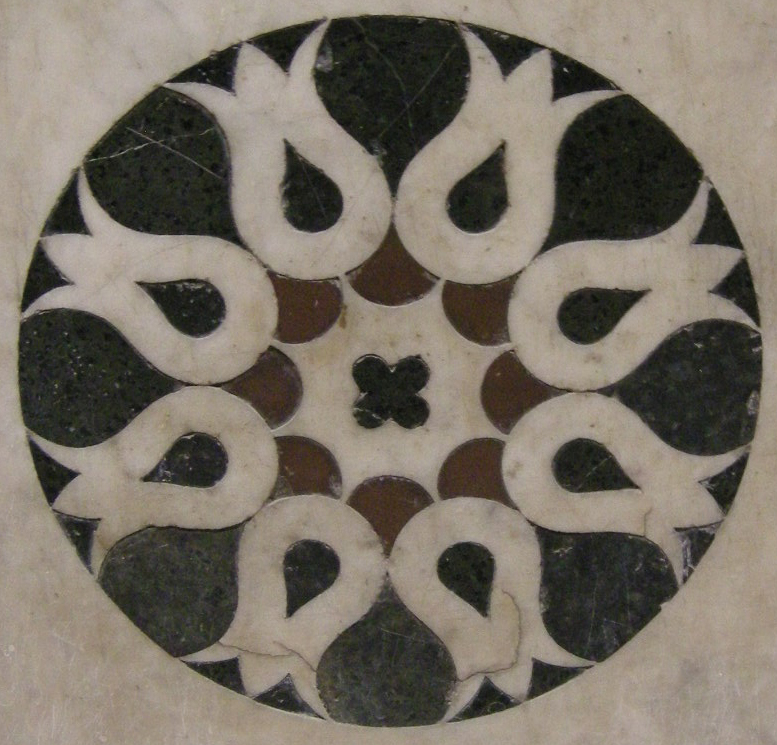
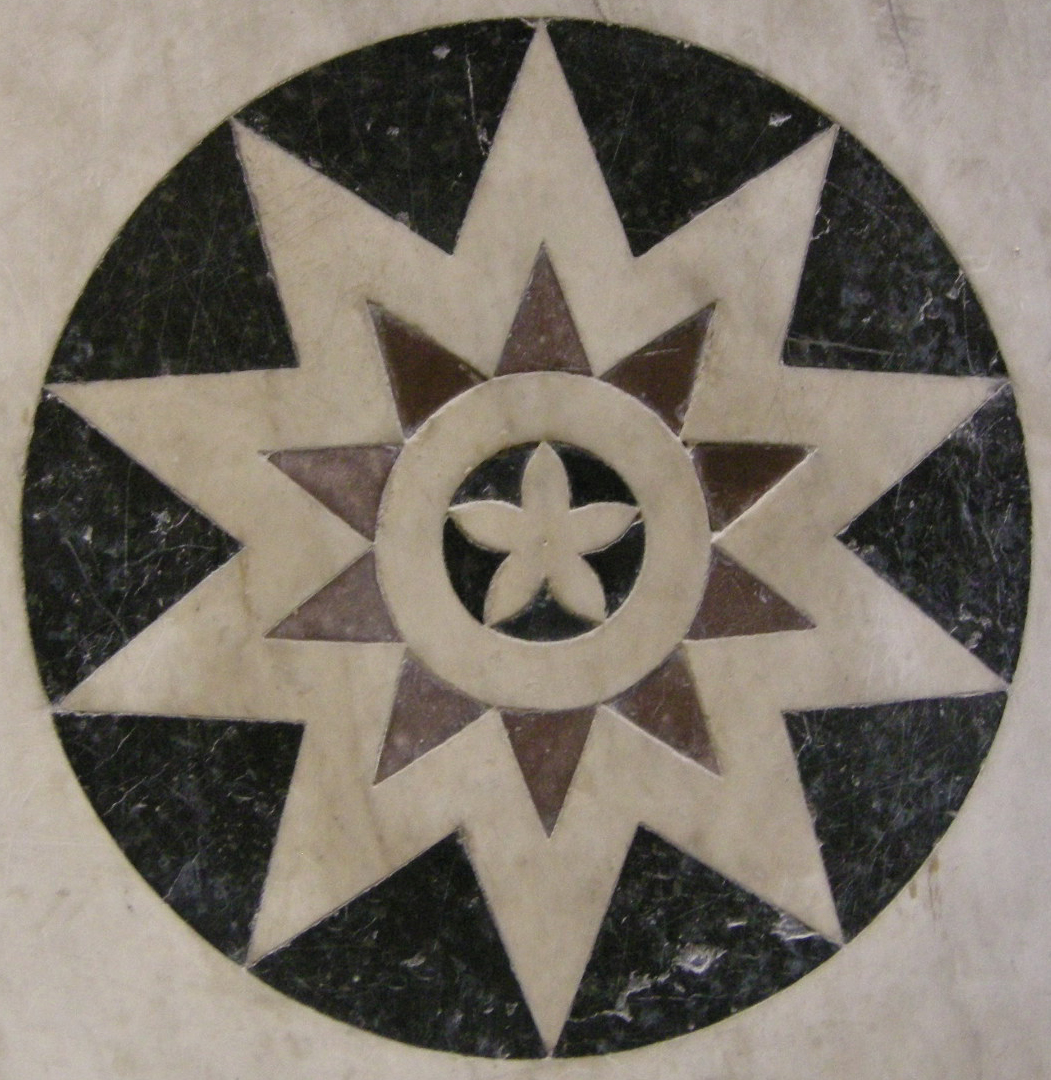
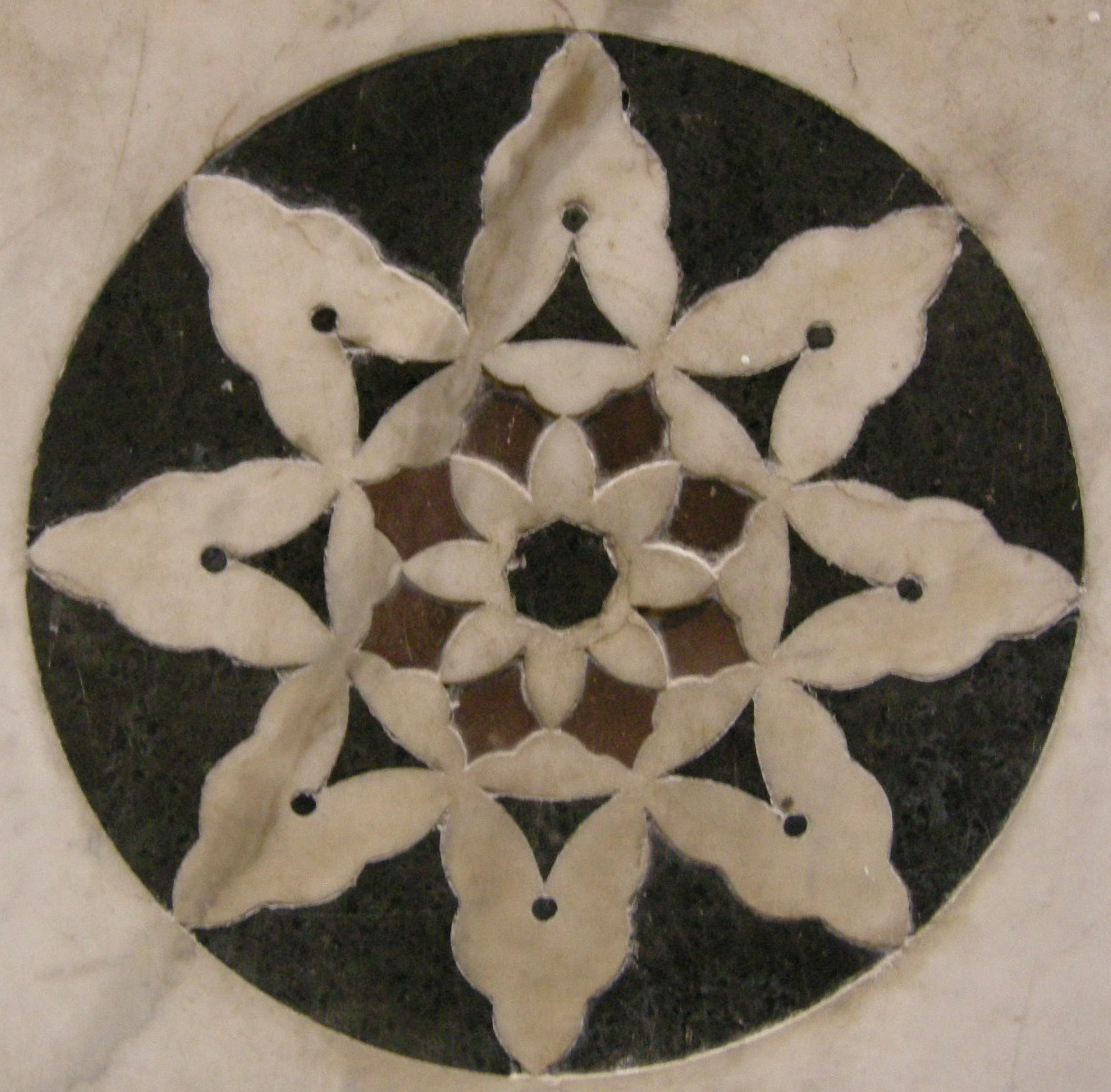
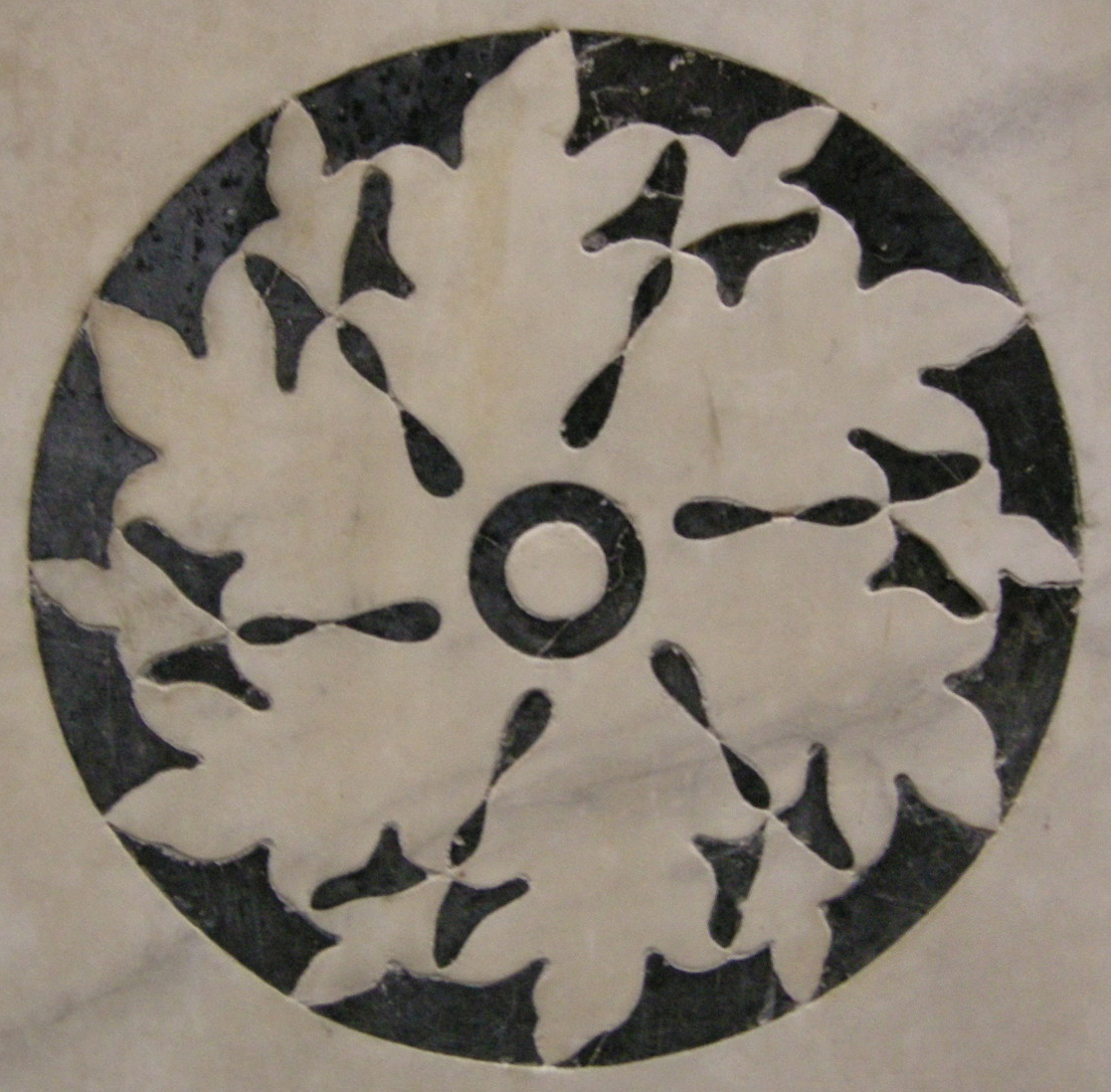
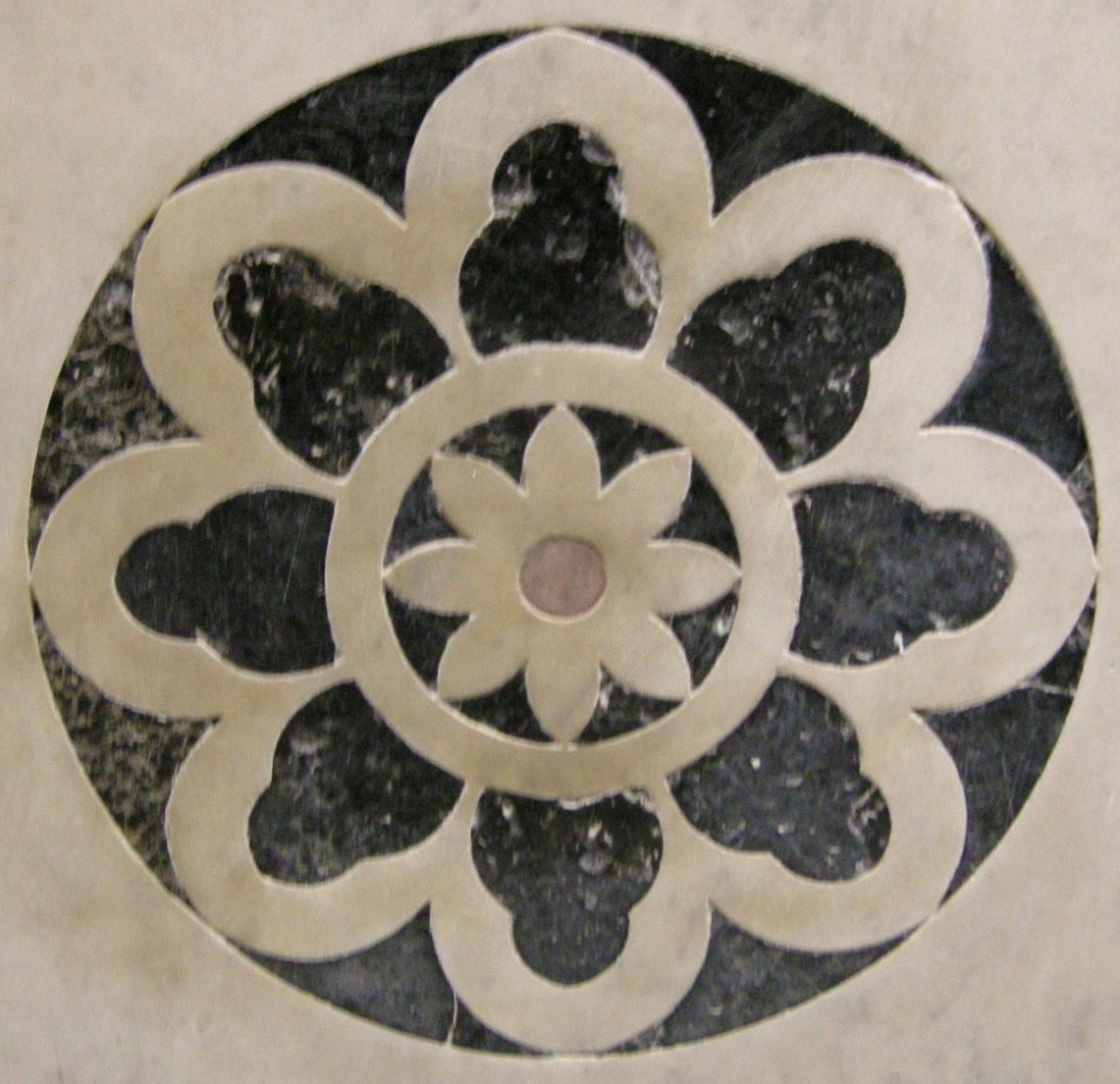
YHESVM QVERITIS N	AZARENVM CRVCIFIXVM SUR	REXIT NON EST HIC ECCE L	OCVS VBI POSVERVNT EVM

West wall	South wall	Apse	North wall

=== Interior ===
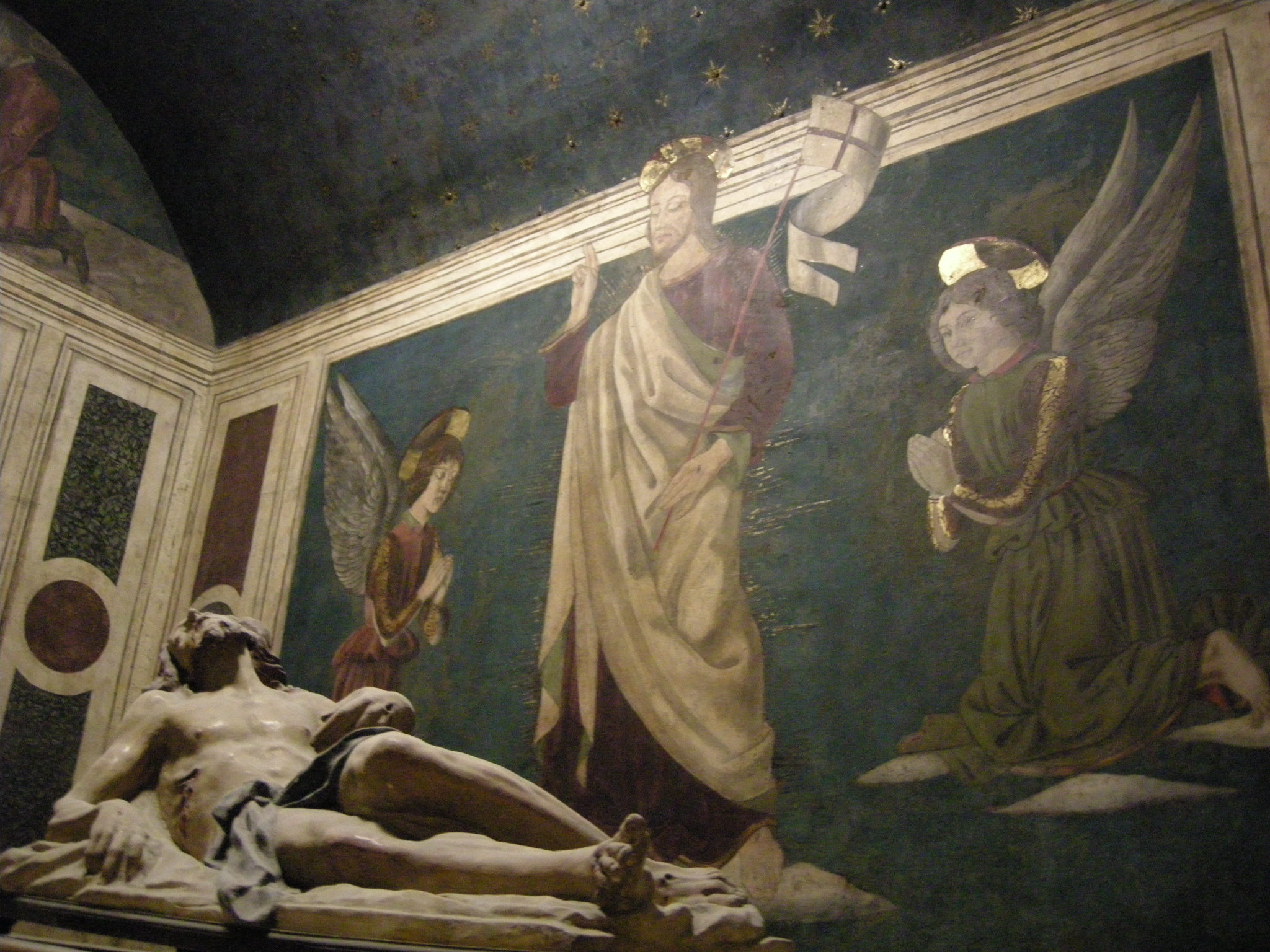
Interior of the sepulchre

The burial chamber takes the entire interior space of the sacellum, with a marble slab placed against its southern wall.

The inner walls and vault of the sepulchre are entirely frescoed, work that one author has attributed to Giovanni da Piamonte.

== See also ==
- Pietra dura, decorative stone inlay work
