= Basilica of San Francesco, Arezzo =

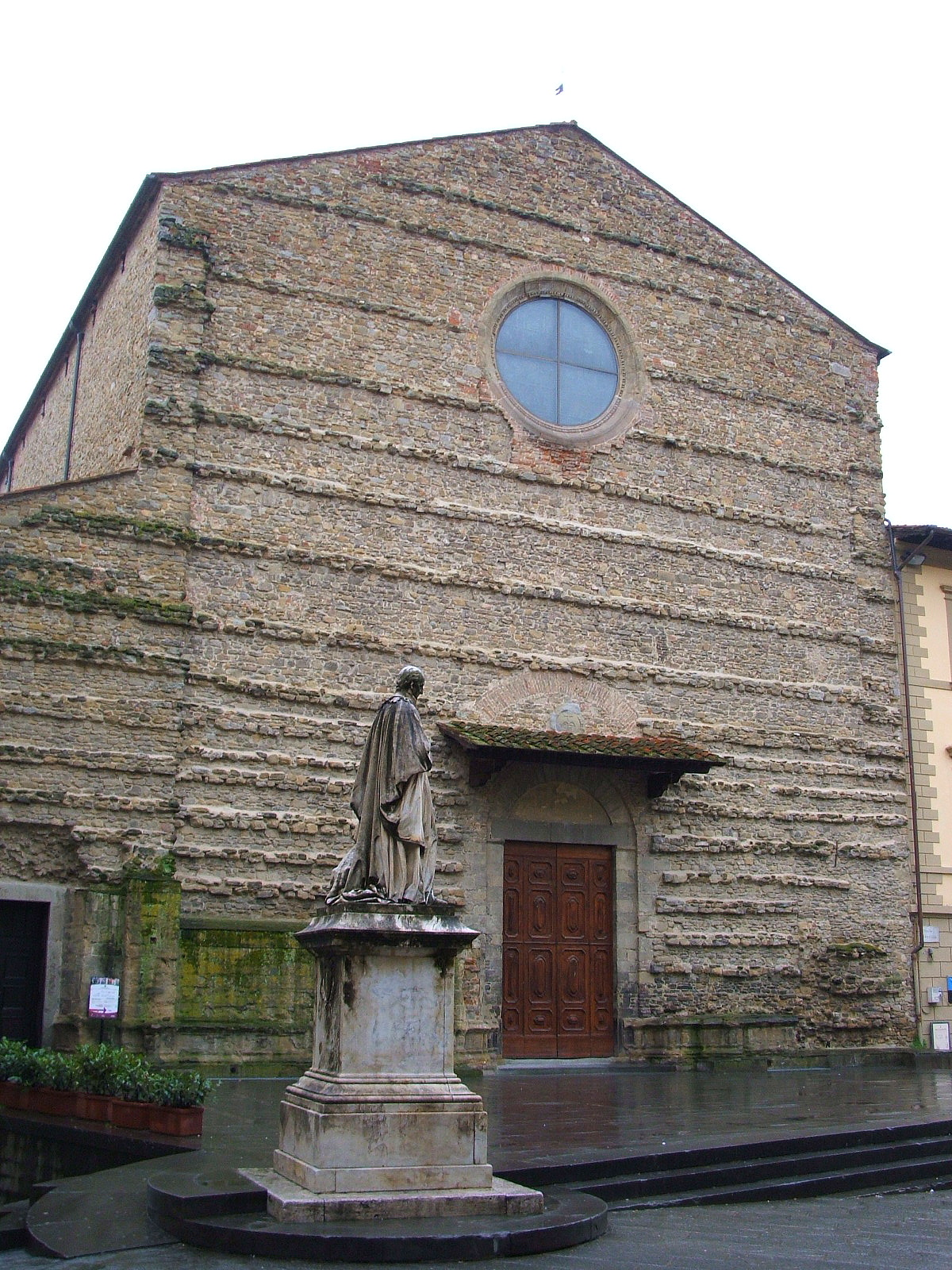
- Façade of the church
- Basilica of San Francesco, Arezzo
- 43°27′52.20″N 11°52′50.88″E
- Country: Italy
- Denomination: Roman Catholic

History
- Dedication: St Francis of Assisi

Architecture
- Architect: Fra Giovanni da Pistoia
- Groundbreaking: 1290

Administration
- Archdiocese: Florence
- Diocese: Arezzo-Cortona-Sansepolcro

The Basilica of San Francesco is a late Medieval church in Arezzo, Tuscany, Italy, dedicated to St Francis of Assisi. It is especially renowned for housing in the chancel the fresco cycle Legends of the True Cross by Piero della Francesca.

== Architecture ==
San Francesco is the second church built by the Franciscans in Arezzo, an earlier church being located outside the city walls and destroyed during the Occupation. The building work on San Francesco was begun around 1290. The decoration of its façade was never realised.

The interior presents as a large church of simple unadorned design with a wide single nave, flanked on the left side by some chapels and, on the right side, by some niches. The tall groin-vaulted chancel is of square plan.

Beneath the church is a smaller Chiesa inferiore or "Lower Church" as at Assisi, with a nave and two aisles, now used as exhibition hall.

== Decoration ==
The interior

At the chancel entrance is suspended a very large painted rood crucifix by one Master of San Francesco, a contemporary of Cimabue. It also contains a Maesta or "Madonna in Majesty" by Guido da Siena.

The walls and particularly the niches on the right have some fresco decoration, which dates in part to the 14th century.

The Cappella Maggiore, (Major Chapel or chancel) houses one of the masterworks of Italian Early Renaissance, a fresco cycle by Piero della Francesca depicting the Legend of the True Cross.

== The frescoes of Legend of the True Cross ==
The painting of the chancel began with a commission by the Aretine family Bicci, who called the painter Bicci di Lorenzo to paint the large cross-vault. In 1452, at Bicci's death, only the four Evangelists had been painted in the vault, as well as the triumphal arch with the Last Judgement and two Doctors of the Church.

Piero della Francesca was called in to complete the work. According to a document, he did so in two stages, the works halted during 1458-1459, and completed in 1466.

The frescoes occupy three levels on the side walls and the eastern wall, surrounding a large window. The theme of the fresco cycle is the Golden Legend by Jacobus de Voragine. Piero della Francesca did not follow a chronological order, preferring to concentrate himself in the creation of symmetrical correspondences between the various scenes.

The episodes depicted are the following:

- Adam dying; Seth meeting the Archangel Michael
- The Adoration of the Holy Wood; the Queen of Sheba kneels in front of the wood from which the cross will be made and meets King Solomon
- The burial of the Holy Cross
- The Annunciation
- Constantine's dream
- Constantine's victory over Maxentius at the battle of Milvian Bridge
- The Torture of a Jew named Judah in the pit
- The Discovery and Proof of the True Cross
- The Battle of Heraclius and Khosrau; defeat and decapitation of the latter
- The Restitution of the Cross; the return of the Cross to Jerusalem
- The Prophets Jeremiah and Isaiah

On the walls of the chancel arch are frescoes which depict: an angel, Cupid, St. Louis, St. Peter, St. Augustine and St. Ambrose.

== See also ==
- Piero della Francesca
- True Cross
- The History of the True Cross
- St. Helen
- Arezzo
- Benedetto Sinigardi
