= San Pancrazio, Florence =

Former Catholic Church in Florence, Italy

Coordinates: 43°46′18.61″N 11°14′59.91″E

San Pancrazio
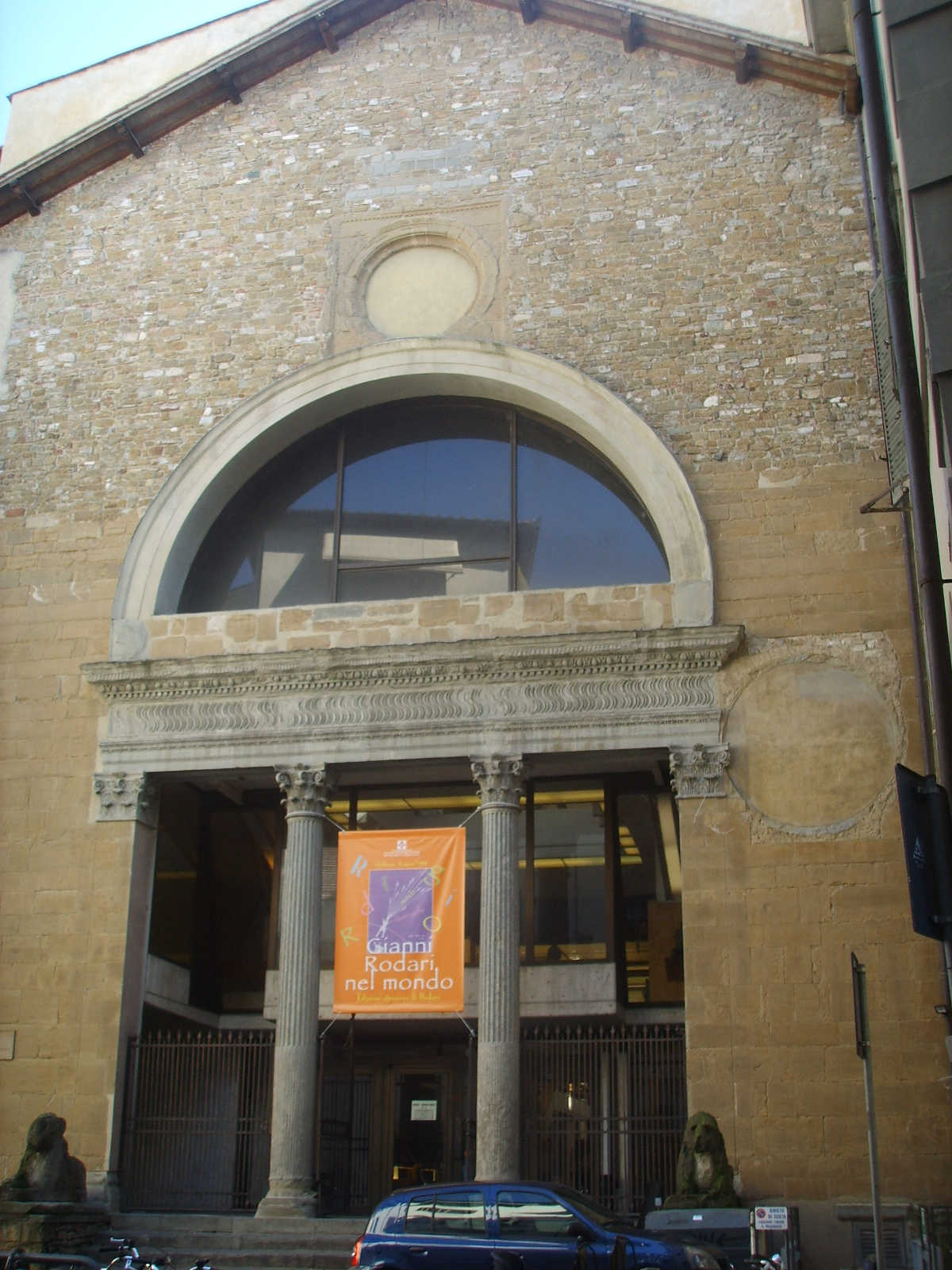
- Façade of the church of San Pancrazio, showing the columns and architrave removed from the Rucellai Chapel

Religion
- Province: Florence
- Region: Tuscany

Location
- Interactive map of San Pancrazio

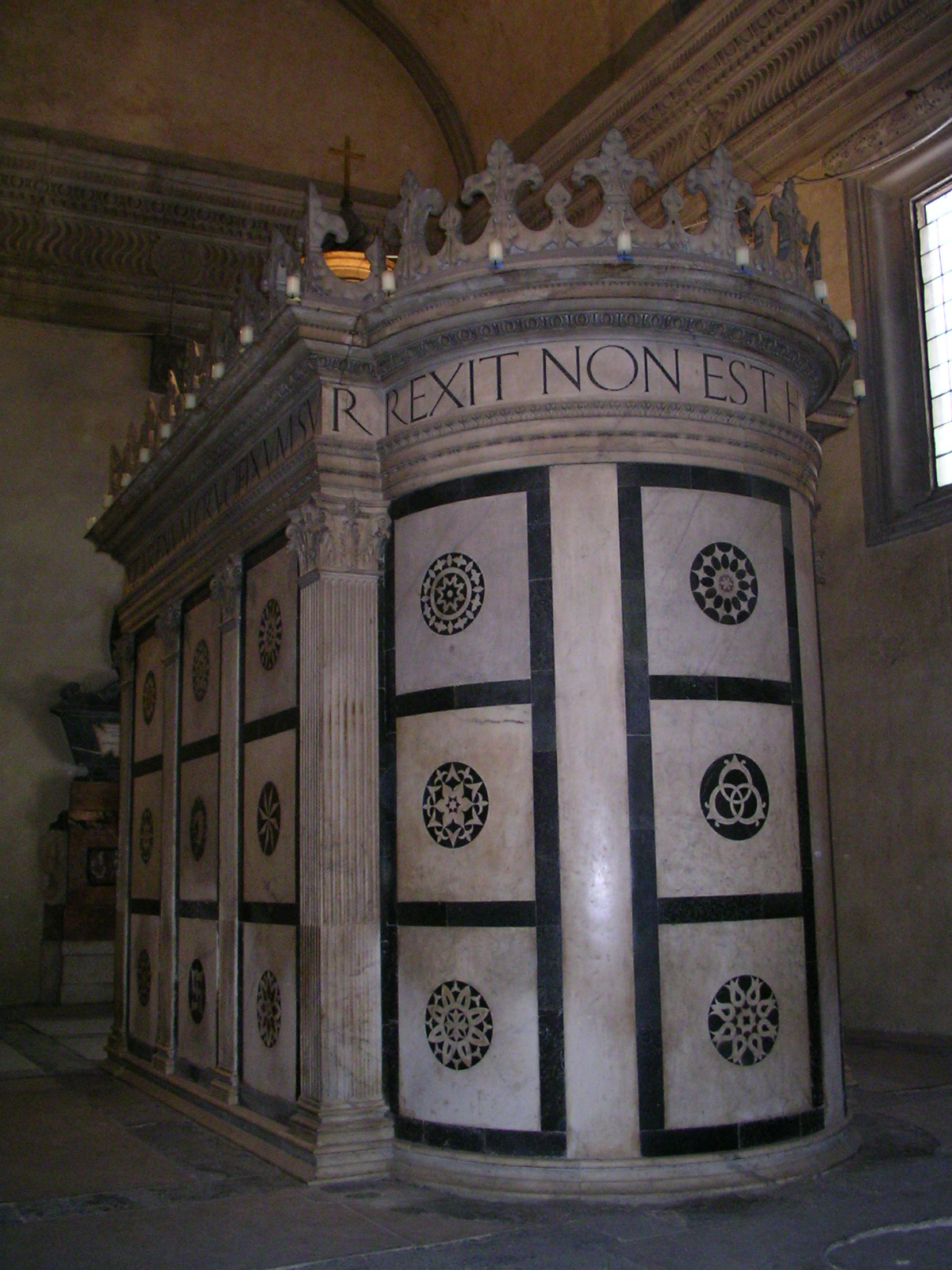
Apse view of the Rucellai Sepulchre

San Pancrazio is a church in Florence, Italy, in Piazza San Pancrazio, behind Palazzo Rucellai. With the exception of the Rucellai Chapel, it is deconsecrated and is home to the museum dedicated to the sculptor Marino Marini. The Rucellai Chapel contains the Rucellai Sepulchre or Tempietto del Santo Sepolcro. Since February 2013 it has been possible to visit the chapel from within the Marini museum.

== Early history ==
The church was built in the early Christian age, and is documented from 931; according to the historian Giovanni Villani, it was founded by Charlemagne. The adjoining Vallombrosian monastery was established in 1157. It was suppressed in 1808. The church was restored and enlarged from the 14th century. A new interior burial spaced opened under the vaults in 1456, but it did not attract a significant number of burials until the early 1460s. The cloister houses a fresco by Neri di Bicci.

=== The Rucellai Chapel ===
Giovanni di Paolo Rucellai commissioned Leon Battista Alberti to build him a tomb in the family chapel in the church. Giorgio Vasari wrote of it in 1568: (Note: Per i medesimi Rucellai in questa stessa maniera fece Leon Batista in San Brancazio una cappella, che si regge sopra gl’architravi grandi, posati sopra due colonne, e due pilastri; forando sotto il muro della chiesa, che è cosa difficile ma sicura. Onde questa opera è delle migliori, che facesse questo architetto. Nel mezo di questa cappella è un sepolcro di marmo molto ben fatto, in forma ovale, & bislungo, simile, come in esso si legge, al sepolcro di Gesù Cristo in Gierusalem.)

For the same Rucellai family Leon Battista [Alberti] made in the same way [i.e., with architraves supported by columns] in San Pancrazio a chapel supported by large architraves placed on two columns and two pilasters, cutting through the wall of the church, which is difficult, but safe. Thus this work is among the best that this architect did. In the middle of this chapel is a sepulchre of marble, very well made, in shape oval and oblong, and similar, as can be read on it, to the sepulchre of Jesus Christ in Jerusalem.

Alberti's work on the Rucellai Chapel and on the sepulchre within it probably began in about 1458; the origins of the chapel date to 1417, when the walls of the nave of San Pancrazio were built. According to the inscription above the door, the sepulchre was completed in 1467. The sepulchre is based on the Holy Sepulchre in the Anastasis in Jerusalem. The exterior is decorated with marble intarsiae; inside are the tombs of Giovanni Rucellai and members of his family, and a fresco by Alesso Baldovinetti.

== Later history ==
The church was modified in the 18th and 19th centuries. From 1808, it was the seat of the city's lottery, then a tribunal, and then a tobacco factory.
