= Soteris =

Roman virgin martyr

Saint Soteris

Virgin Martyr
- Died: 304; Rome, Roman Empire
- Cause of death: Martyrdom by decapitation
- Venerated in: Eastern Orthodox Church; Roman Catholic Church
- Canonized: Pre-Congregation
- Feast: 10 February (Eastern Orthodox); 11 February (Roman Catholic)

Saint Soteris (Italian: Santa Sotere, died 304 AD) was a Roman Christian virgin martyr, who was put to death for her faith in the early 4th century. She is venerated as a saint in the Eastern Orthodox Church and Roman Catholic church, with a feast day on 10 February and 11 February respectively.

== Life ==
Traditionally, Soteris was said to be a woman of very great beauty, who dressed modestly and consecrated her virginity to Christ. She was arrested on account of her Christian faith and underwent torture, before being finally beheaded, perhaps around 304 AD.

== Relics ==
The Martyrologium Hieronymianum states that her remains were initially buried in the Catacombs of Callixtus in the 3rd century along the Appian Way as it approached Rome, which also contained the remains of Saint Cecilia and many other martyrs. In the same region was dedicated a basilica to Saint Soteris. Pope Sergius II later transferred the relics to the church of San Martino ai Monti in Rome.

== Relation to Ambrose of Milan ==
Saint Ambrose of Milan claimed that he, his older sister Saint Marcellina, and their brother Saint Satyrus, descended from Soteris' family, and he wrote about her in his works, De virginibus and Exhortatio virginis.
