= Satyr (disambiguation) =

A satyr is a mythical creature.

Satyr may also refer to:

- Satyr (Dungeons & Dragons), a fictional creature in Dungeons & Dragons
- Satyr (film), a 1996 pornographic film
- Satyr (band), a progressive, post-hardcore band from Atlanta, Georgia
- Satyr (musician) or Sigurd Wongraven (born 1975)
- HMS Satyr (1916), an R-class destroyer
- HMS Satyr (P214), an S-class submarine launched in 1942
- USS Satyr (ARL-23)
- Miles Satyr, a 1930s British single-seat aerobatic biplane

== See also ==
- Common satyr (Aulocera swaha), a butterfly
- HMS Satyr, a list of ships
- Satyress, a female satyr
- Satyricon (disambiguation)
- Satyrinae, a subfamily of butterflies
- Satyrus (disambiguation)
