= Guido Tarlati =

Bishop of Arezzo

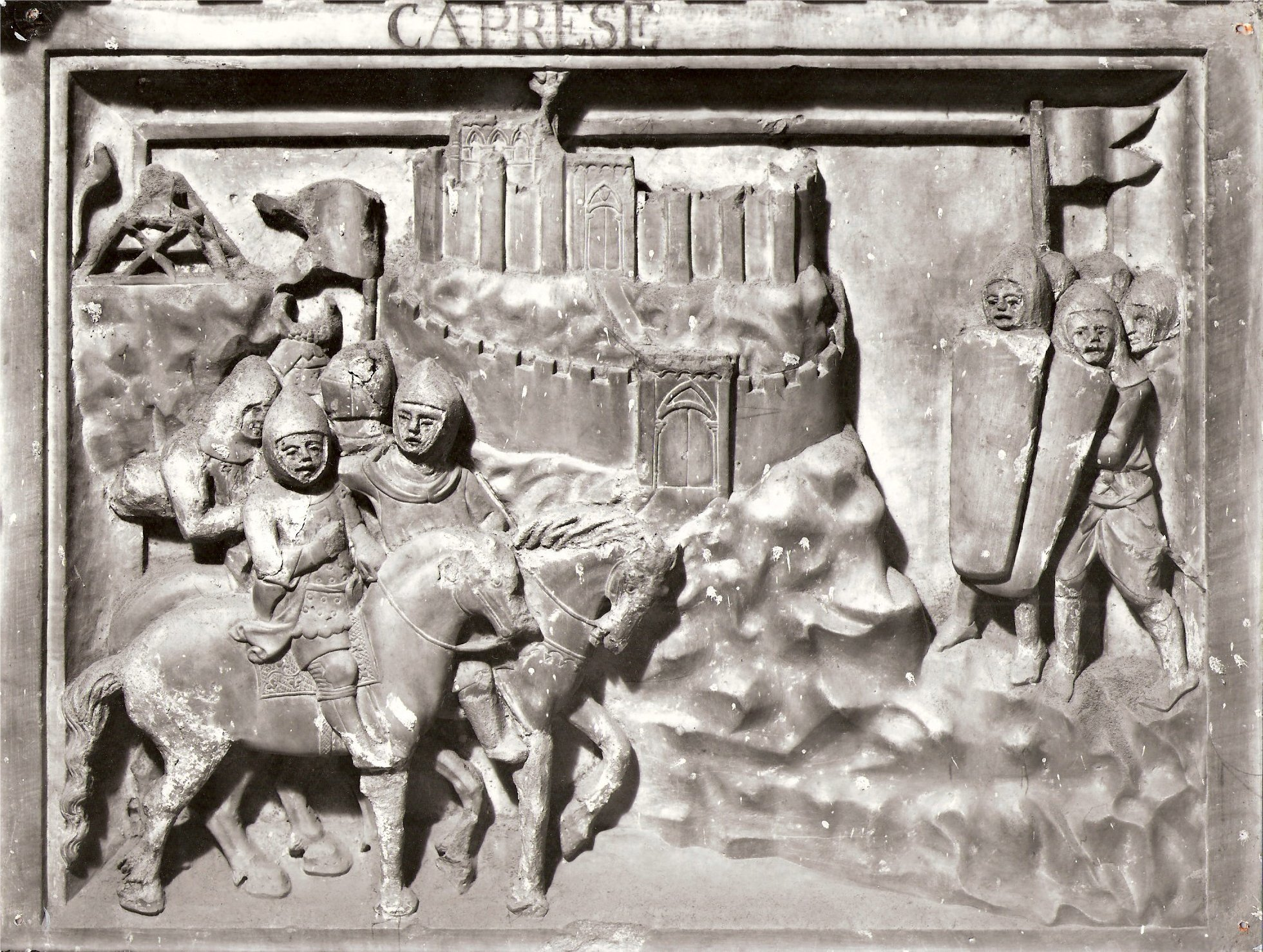
Panel from Guido Tarlati's tomb representing the capture of the castle of Caprese.

Guido Tarlati (died 1327) was a lord and Bishop of Arezzo.

== Bishop ==
Tarlati was a member of the leading Ghibelline family of Arezzo, who were centered in their fief at Pietramala. In Arezzo, two aristocratic factions contended for domination, the Verdi and the Secchi, and when the latter gained control they had their leader, Guido Tarlati, Archpriest of the Pieve of S. Maria Aretina, elected bishop in 1312.

The electoral meeting following the death of Bishop Ildebrandino (1289–1312) chose to proceed by the "Way of compromise" and elected two persons, both Canons of the cathedral, to make the selection. They chose Guido, and the rest of the electoral meeting concurred and ratified the election. Guido immediately accepted, and procurators were chosen to carry the record of the election to the Papal Court at Avignon. Pope Clement V appointed a committee of three cardinals to look into the election and the character of the candidate, and when a favorable report was received, he issued a confirmation of the election of Bishop Guido on 7 July 1312.

He embarked on an activist program, building a wall around the city, and creating a new silver and copper currency. His program also included military conquest; on his funeral monument appear the names of: Lusignano, Chiusi, Fronzoli, Castel Focognano, Rondina, Bucine, Caprese, Lacerina, and Monte Sansovino.

=== Patronages and war ===
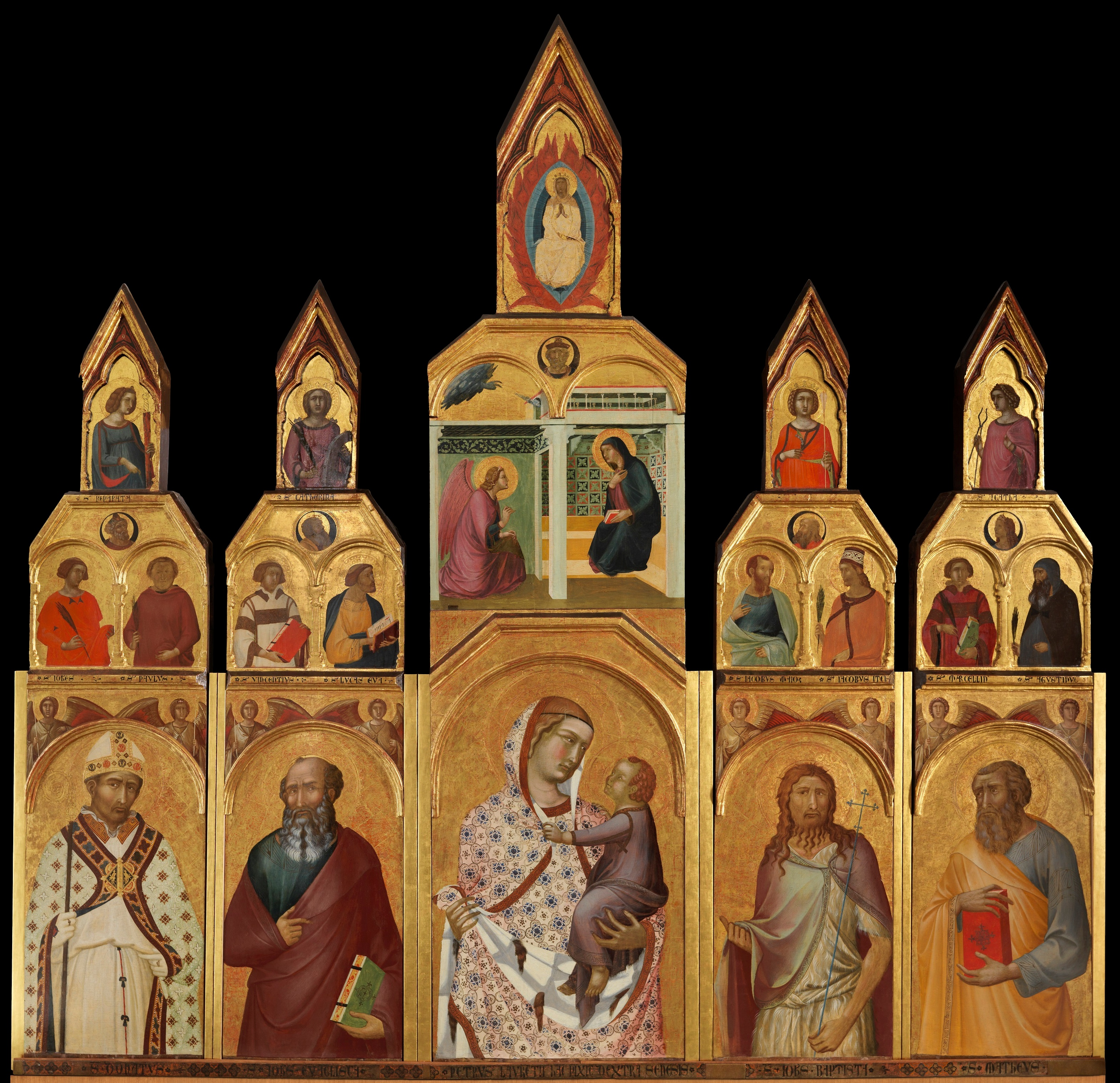
Arezzo Polyptych, 1320. Arezzo, Santa Maria della Pieve.

The gilded three-story altarpiece, the Arezzo (or Aretine or Tarlati) Polyptych, was commissioned in 1320 by Bishop Tarlati for the Santa Maria della Pieve in Arezzo. At its centre is the Madonna (draped in a magnificent ermine-lined robe) and Child, flanked (from left to right) by the saints Donatus (Arezzo's patron saint), John the Evangelist, John the Baptist, and Matthew.

In 1321 he was declared seignior of Arezzo, a position he held until his death. During his administration he supported Uguccione della Faggiola and Castruccio Castracani, lords of Lucca, in their wars against Florence.

Tarlati also expanded the territories of Arezzo, and in 1323, with the collaboration of Francesco I Ordelaffi (Ghibelline lord of Forlì), he conquered Città di Castello. Arezzo's expansion caused, however, the deterioration of the relations with the Papal States, ending with the excommunication of Tarlati by Pope John XXII.

=== Downfall ===
On 19 June 1325, Pope John XXII raised the commune of Cortona in the diocese of Arezzo to episcopal rank, as a reward for the fidelity of its Guelph populace. The diocese of Arezzo was greatly diminished in size, and Bishop Guido's spiritual powers terminated. The papal bull refers to the once Bishop Guido, indicating that he had already been deposed. A month later, on 20 July 1325, Guido Tarlati de Petramala was excommunicated. Bishop Guido was replaced by an Apostolic Administrator, Boso Ubertini, the Provost of Arezzo. Boso was named Bishop of Arezzo on 5 December 1326. But Tarlati hindered Boso from carrying out his functions.

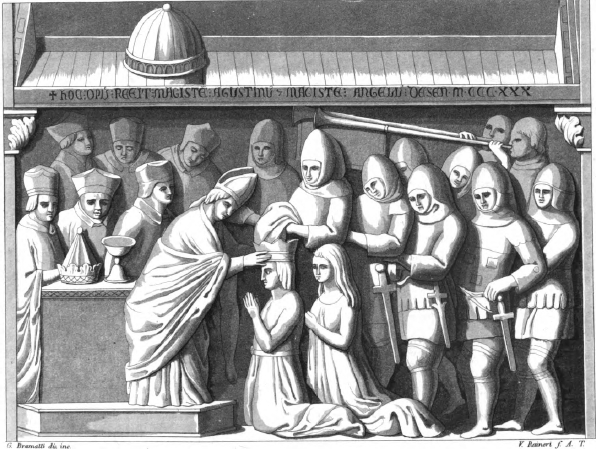
The coronation of Emperor Louis IV by Bishop Tarlati

Tarlati's prestige as the leader in Tuscany of the Ghibelline party, however, was so high that German emperor Louis IV wanted to receive from him the Iron Crown. The coronation took place in Milan on 31 May 1327.

== Reconciliation and Death ==
A short time before his death Tarlati reconciled with the Pope.

According to Giorgio Vasari the tomb commissioned by Guido's brother, the condottiero Pier Saccone Tarlati di Pietramala, was designed by Giotto (although this is disputed), who recommended to Pier Saccone the Sienese sculptors Agnolo da Ventura and Agostino di Giovanni to execute it. It is located in the Cathedral of Arezzo.

== Sources ==
- Bullarum diplomatum et privilegiorum sanctorum romanorum pontificum taurinensis (in Latin). Vol. Tomus IV. Turin (Augusta Taurinorum): Seb. Franco et Henrico Dalmazzo editoribus. 1859. pp. 312–315.
- Droandi, Enzo (1993). Guido Tarlati Di Pietramala, Ultimo Principe Di Arezzo. Cortona: Calosci. ISBN 978-88-7785-087-4.
- Licciardello, Pierluigi (2015). Un vescovo contro il papato: conflitto fra Guido Tarlati e Giovanni XXII (1312-1339). Studi di storia aretina, 12 (in Italian). Arezzo: Società storica aretina. ISBN 978-88-89754-17-7.
- Scharf, Gian Paolo G. (2014). "La lenta ascesa di una famiglia signorile i Tarlati di Pietramala prima del 1321". Archivio Storico Italiano. 172 (2 (640)): 203–248. JSTOR 26226572.
