= Santa Maria della Pieve =

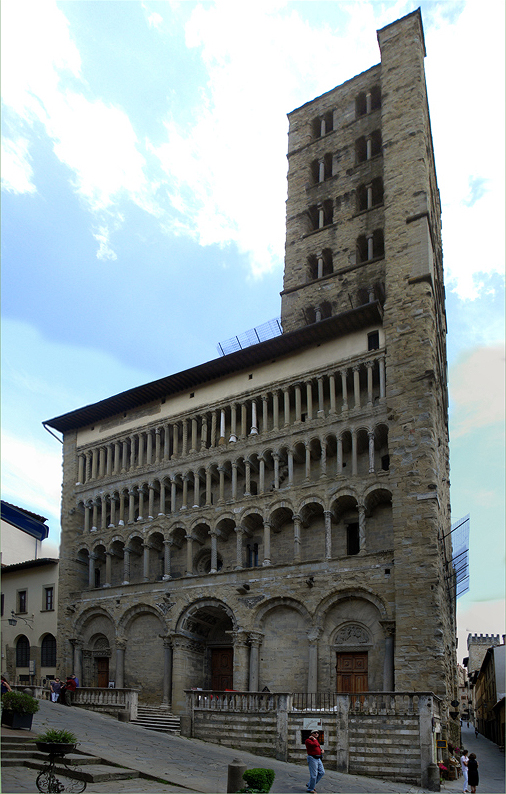
- Santa Maria della Pieve
- Santa Maria della Pieve
- 43°27′54″N 11°53′01″E
- Country: Italy
- Denomination: Roman Catholic

History
- Dedication: St Mary the Virgin

Administration
- Archdiocese: Florence
- Diocese: Arezzo-Cortona-Sansepolcro

Santa Maria della Pieve is a church in Arezzo, Tuscany, central Italy.

== History ==
The church is documented since as early as 1008, and, during the communal period of Arezzo, it was the stronghold of the city's struggle against its bishops. After the latter built the nearby Cathedral and palace, the church, which had been already rebuilt in the 12th century, was further renovated with the façade and the apse, and the interior was remade in Gothic style (13th century).

The bell tower, finished in 1330, is in Romanesque style.

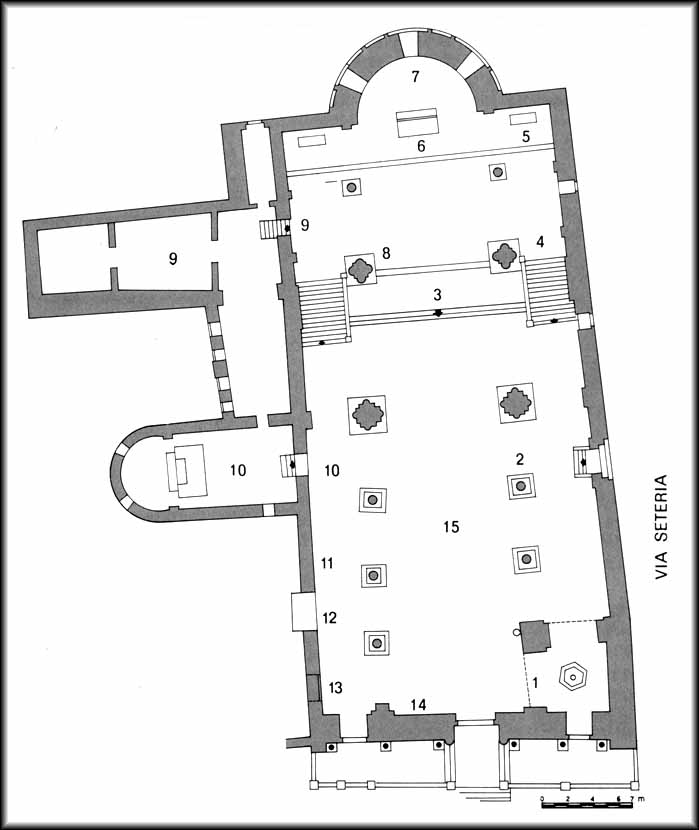
Plan of the church

== Description ==
The church's most striking feature is its façade, with a five-arch lower floor surmounted by three loggias, with the number of columns increasing with the elevation. The columns, and its capitals, are each different from the other (one is a statue). The original façade had no particular features, the current decoration having been added in the 12th century.

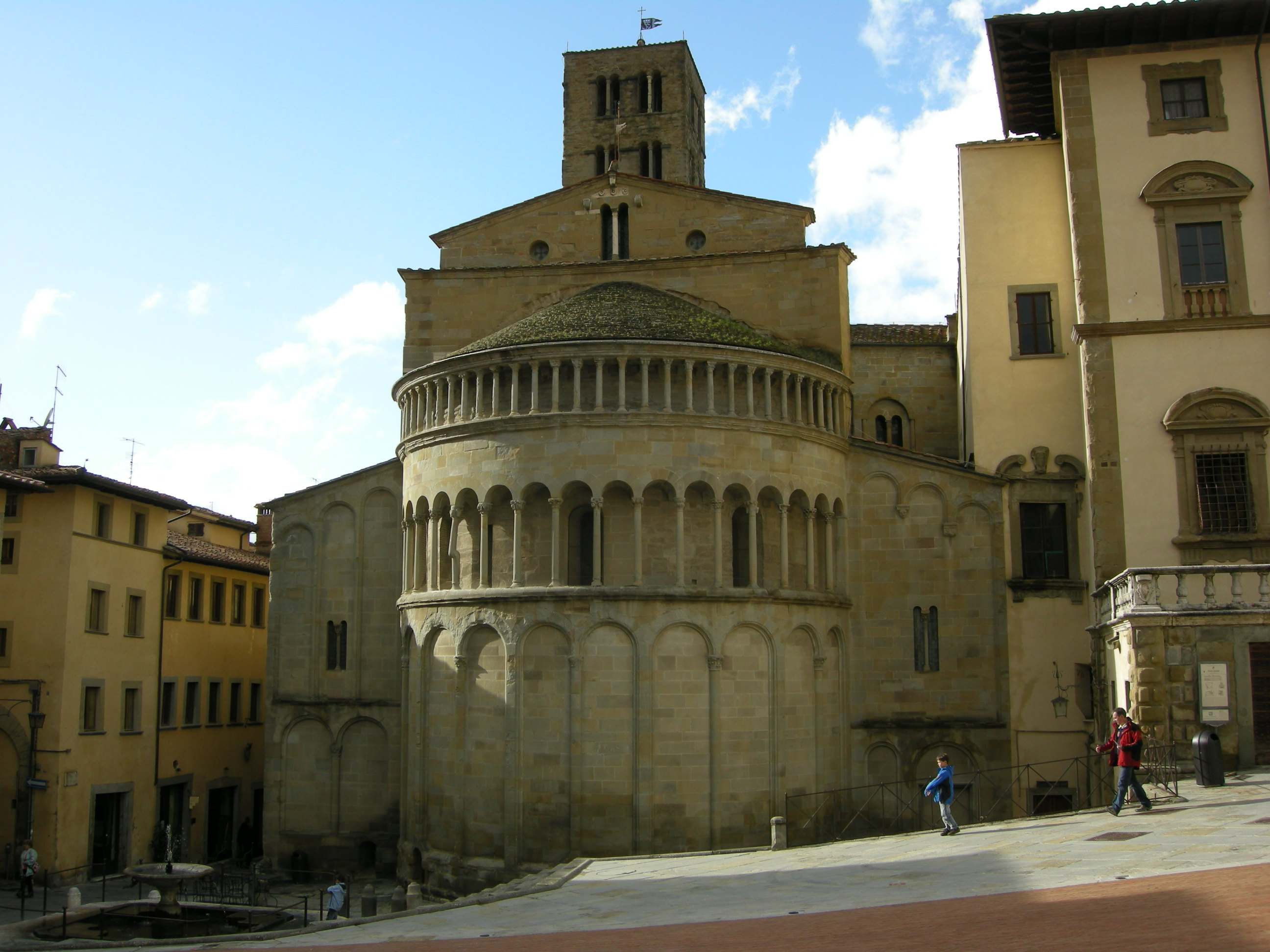
View of the apse

The central portal has a barrel vault entrance, and a lunette with a bas-relief of the Praying Madonna with Angels. Under her is a frieze with small angels, and the signature by one Marchionne. In the vault are depictions of the Months of the school of Benedetto Antelami. The two side portals, of smaller proportions, have also decorated lunettes: they depict "Christ Baptized by John" on the right and, at the left, a vegetable motif.

The 13th century apse has also two rows of loggia which recall the façade's structure, repeating the use of different style capitals. The sides have mullioned windows.

The tall interior has a nave and two aisles, divided by longitudinal ogival arches whose columns have Corinthian capitals. The counter-façade has nine windows on three rows. At the high altar is the Tarlati polyptych, representing the Madonna and Saints, by Pietro Lorenzetti (1320), while traces of frescoes with St. Dominic and St. Francis (attributed to Andrea di Nerlo, mid-14th century) can be seen inside the church. The crypt houses a reliquary bust of St. Donatus, executed in 1346.

The bell tower has a sturdy appearance with five rows of mullioned windows. Internally, the base houses the baptistery. The baptismal font dates to the 14th century, and has panels with Stories of St. John the Baptist by Giovanni d'Agostino (1332–1333).
