= Alessandro Strozzi =

Alessandro Strozzi may refer to:

- Alessandro Strozzi (bishop of Arezzo) (1631–1682), Italian Roman Catholic prelate
- Alessandro Strozzi (archbishop of Fermo) (died 1621), Italian Roman Catholic prelate
- Alessandro Strozzi (bishop of San Miniato) (died 1648), Italian Roman Catholic prelate
- Alessandro Strozzi (bishop of Volterra) (died 1568) Italian Roman Catholic prelate
