= Santa Maria presso San Satiro =

Church in Milan, Italy

Coordinates: 45°27′45.53″N 9°11′16.92″E

Church of Santa Maria presso San Satiro (Chiesa di Santa Maria presso San Satiro)
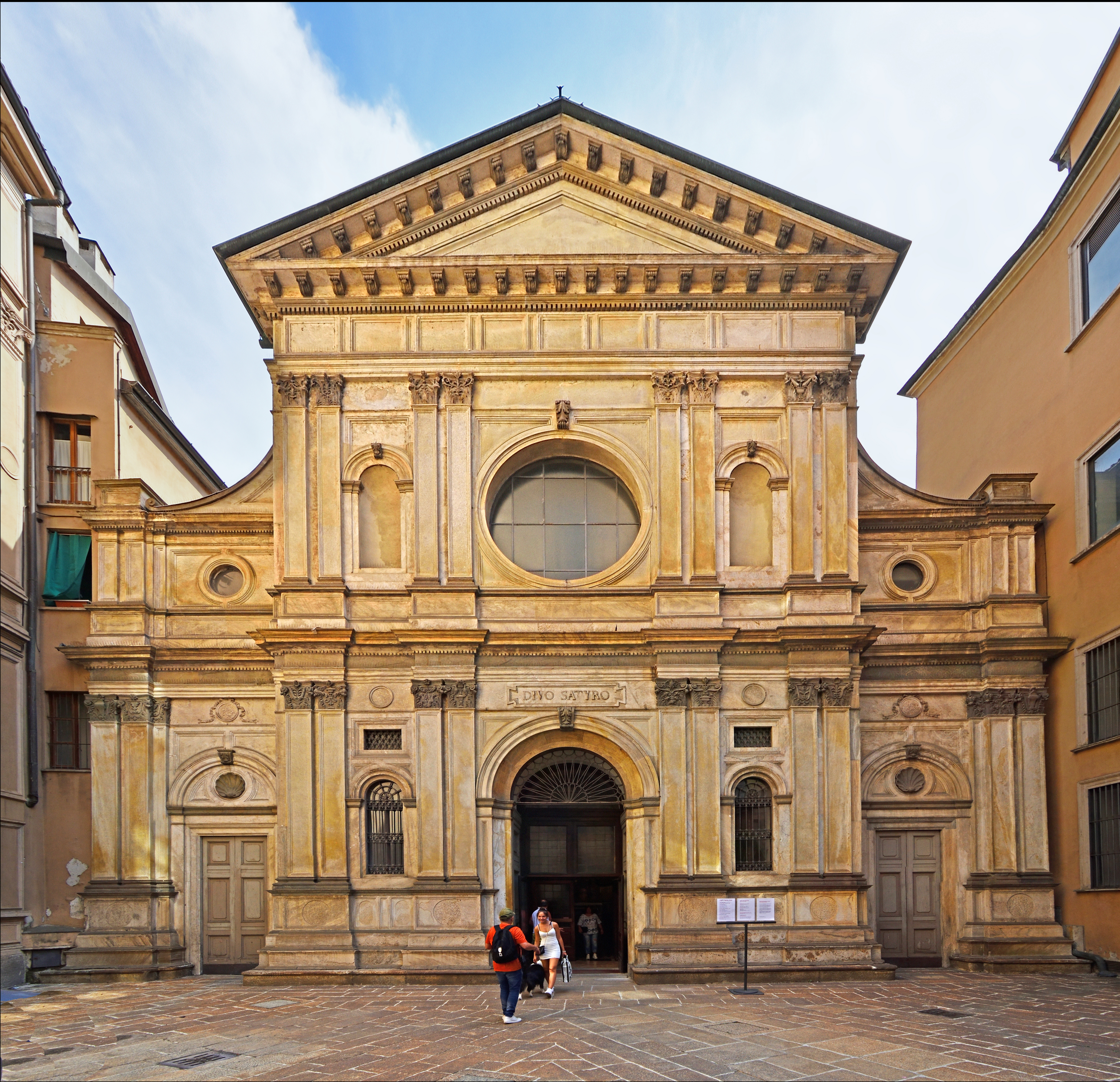
- Façade of the church

Religion
- Affiliation: Roman Catholic
- Province: Milan
- Status: Active

Location
- Location: Milan, Italy
- Interactive map of Church of Santa Maria presso San Satiro (Chiesa di Santa Maria presso San Satiro)

Architecture
- Architects: Donato Bramante; Giovanni Antonio Amadeo
- Type: Church
- Style: Renaissance
- Groundbreaking: 1476
- Completed: 1482

Santa Maria presso San Satiro (Saint Mary near Saint Satyrus) is a church in Milan. The Italian Renaissance structure (1476–1482) houses the early medieval shrine to Satyrus, brother of Saint Ambrose. The church is known for its false apse, an early example of trompe-l'œil, attributed to Donato Bramante.

== History ==
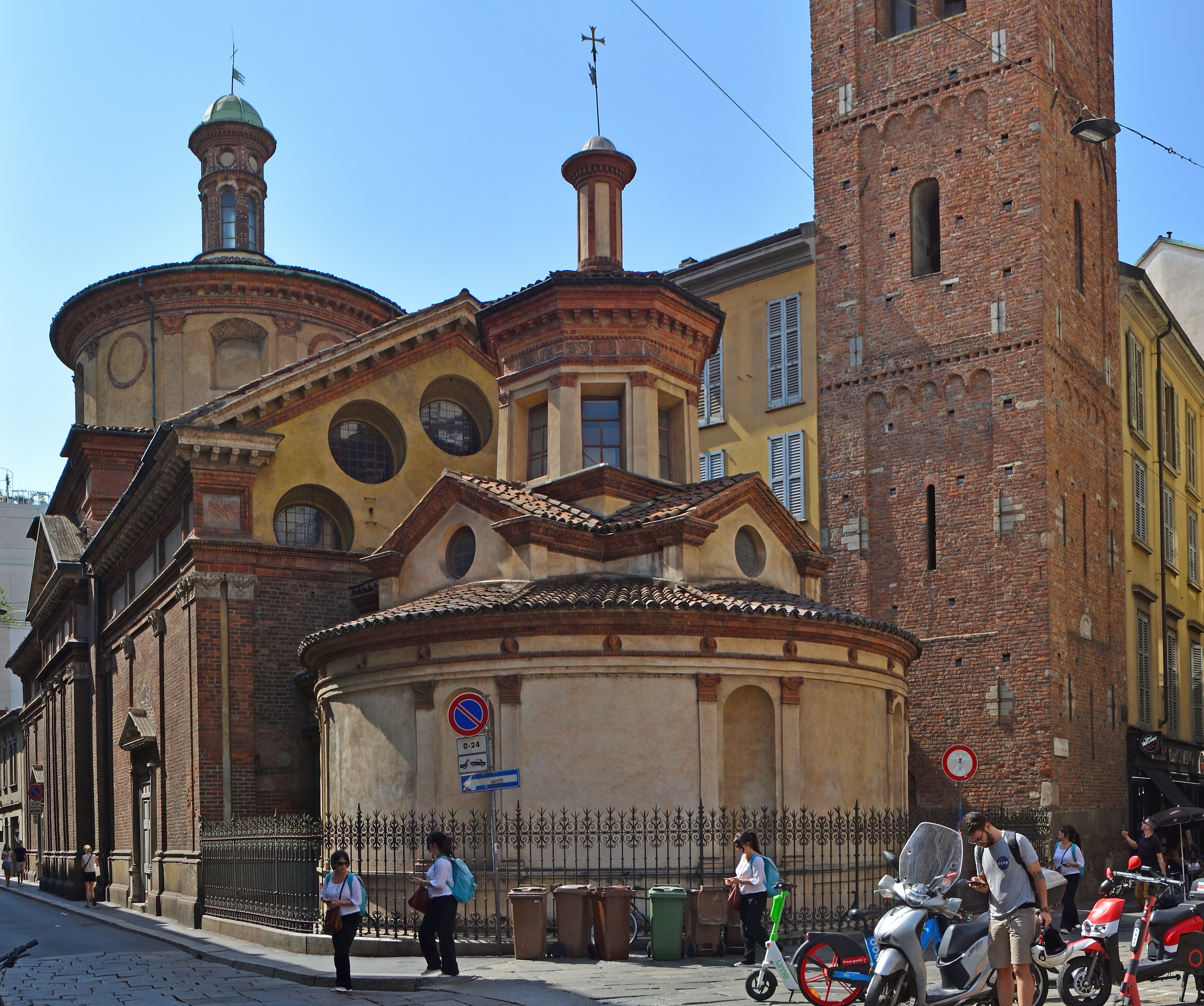
The chapel of S. Satiro (876)

The church lies on the site of a primitive worship place erected by the archbishop Anspertus in 879, dedicated to Saint Satyrus, confessor and brother of Saints Ambrose and Marcellina. The current church was instead built from 1472 to 1482 under commission from Duchess Bona di Savoia and Duke Gian Galeazzo Sforza. According to some sources, the designer was Donato Bramante, who had recently moved from the Marche. However, recent documents prove that Bramante had a minor role, with most of the work being attributable to Giovanni Antonio Amadeo, who designed the façade. It is certain that Bramante is responsible for the sacristy perspective. According to sources attributing the entire chapel to Bramante, Agostino de Fondulis included a terracotta bust of the architect.

The edifice has a nave and two aisles with barrel vault. The nave is surmounted by a hemispherical dome at the crossing with the transept. The bell tower is still that of the Romanesque edifice preceding the 1480s reconstruction. Also from the 15th century is the baptistry annexed to the church.

Originally the interior was decorated with white and gold paint. The walls had frescoes by Ambrogio Bergognone, now transferred to the Pinacoteca di Brera. The ancient sacellum of San Satiro was also covered with cotto decoration and enriched with a terracotta portraying the Dead Christ by Agostino de Fondulis. Also by the same artist are several terracotta busts in the sacristy, which is on the central plan, inspired to the Portinari Chapel of Sant'Eustorgio or to the Colleoni Chapel. The church contains an altarpiece of the Extasis of St Philip Neri (1764) by Giuseppe Peroni.

== Trompe-l'œil ==
The choir, which had to be truncated a depth of only 90 cm (3.0 ft) due to the presence of the road Via Falcone behind the church, was replaced by Bramante with a painted perspective, realizing in this way one of the first examples of trompe-l'œil in the history of art.

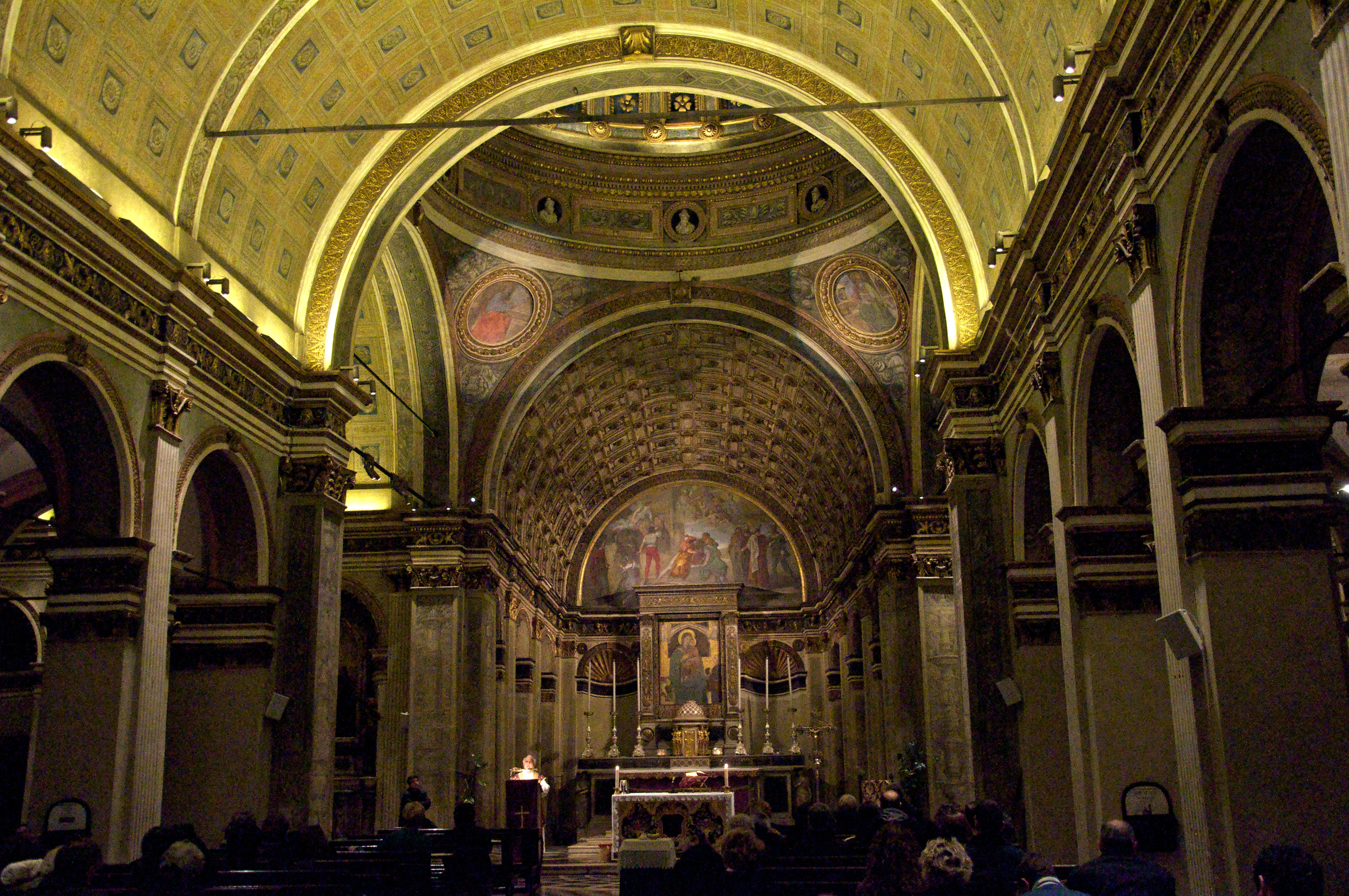
The interior with the Bramante's perspective illusion choir viewed from the nave.

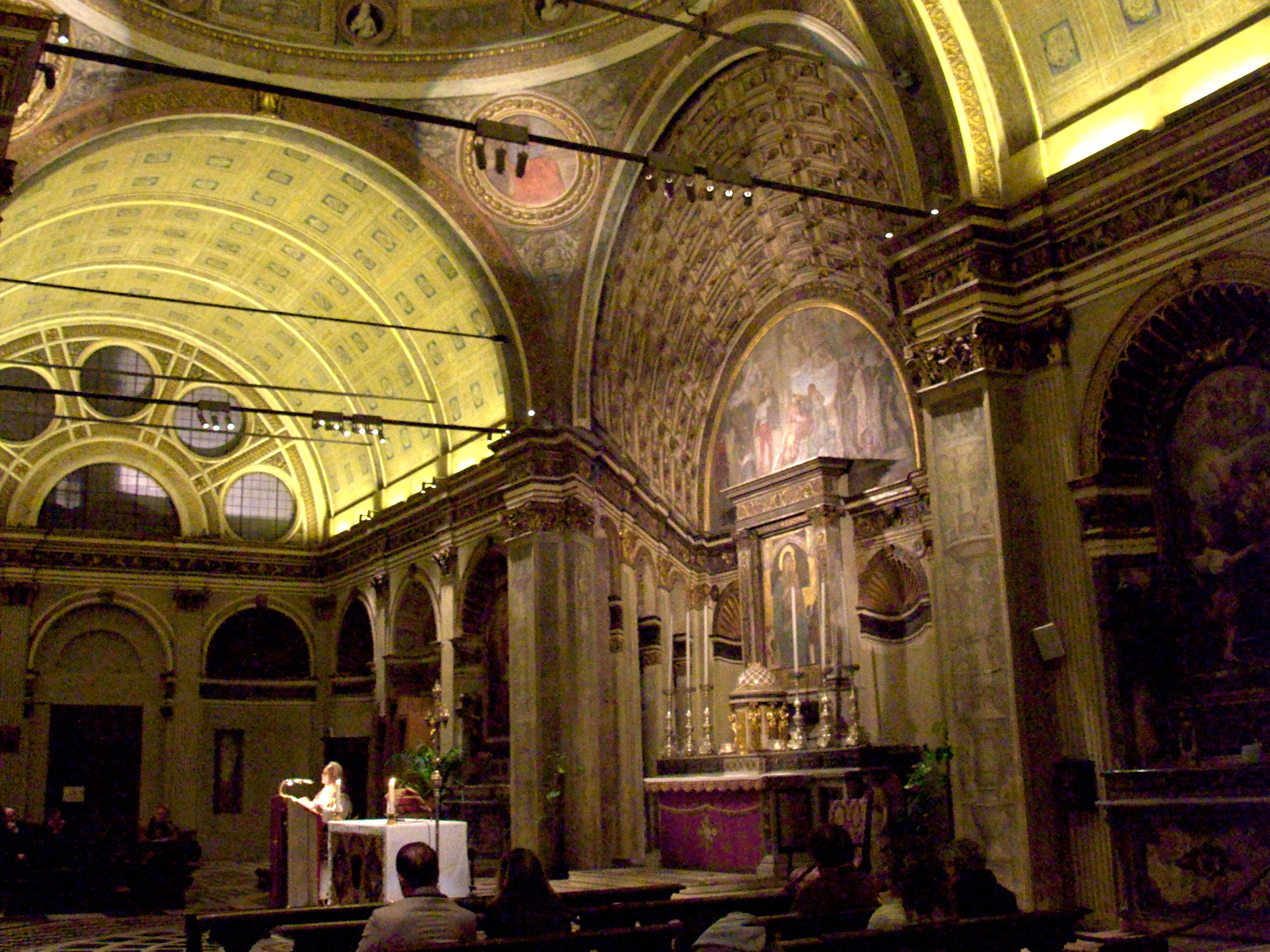
Bramante's perspective illusion choir viewed from the west transept.

== See also ==
- Early medieval domes
- Late medieval domes
- Italian Renaissance domes
