= Diocesan Museum of Sacred Art (Arezzo) =

Museum in Arezzo, Italy

Diocesan museum of sacred art (Arezzo)
- Museo diocesano di arte sacra (MuDAS)
- Established: 1963
- Location: Arezzo, Italy
- Coordinates: 43.4670602°N 11.8802726°E
- Type: Diocesan museum
- Key holdings: Giorgio Vasari, Spinello Aretino, Bernardo Rossellino, Bartolomeo della Gatta

The Diocesan Museum of Sacred Art (MuDAS) (Italian: Museo diocesano di arte sacra) in Arezzo was founded in 1963 but opened regularly to the public only in 1985, and was housed in several rooms above the sacristy of the Cathedral of San Donato. In 2011 it was relocated to the first floor of the bishop's residence. The museum exhibits works of art and liturgical items, from the 12th to the 19th centuries, that come from the cathedral and other churches in the diocesan territory, significant for their religious and cultural significance to Arezzo and the surrounding area. Highlights of the museum include several works of Giorgio Vasari and the Pace di Siena.

The museum is accessible to the disabled, offers space for teaching, temporary exhibitions, and restoration.

== Works ==
The museum occupies five rooms and offers an itinerary focusing on history, art, and devotional practices of the region, the Diocese of Arezzo-Cortona-Sansepolcro.

=== First room ===
The first room contains the oldest works among which are paintings, sculptures, illuminated manuscripts, liturgical vestments, and medieval gold and silver work, including:

- Pace di Siena containing Christ on the cross with angels (front) and Our Lady of Sorrows (reverse) (early 15th century), in gold, enamels, precious stones, and pearls, from France-Flanders; contained in a reliquary of silver, bronze, and gold-plated copper, made in 1815 by the Roman Giuseppe Spagna;
- Crucifix (12th-13th century), painted wood;
- Series of thuribles (13th century), bronze, from Arezzo;
- St. James arm-reliquary (14th-15th centuries), gold-plated copper and precious stones, from Arezzo;
- Annunciation (1375-1400), tempera on wood, by Andrea di Nerio;
- Madonna with child enthroned among St. James, St. Anthony the abbot, and the donor (1377) and Annunciation (1380-1385), detached frescoes, by Spinello Aretino;
- Polyptych with the Madonna with child enthroned and the evangelists (1430-1440), attributed to Stefano di Antonio di Vanni;
- Tabernacle with Annunciation (1434), in terracotta relief, attributed to Bernardo Rossellino.

=== Second room ===
The second room is dedicated to works made in the 15th and early 16th centuries. Of particular interest are:

- processional cross (14th-15th century), in rock crystal and gold-plated copper, from the Venetian school;
- bust of San Donato (middle of the 15th century), in painted terracotta, attributed to Luca della Robbia;
- St. Jerome, penitent (end of the 15th century), detached fresco, by Bartolomeo della Gatta;
- predella with the Wedding of Mary and Joseph, the Birth of Mary, St. Francis of Assisi, the Presentation in the temple, and St. Bernardino of Siena (1518-1519), tempera on wood, from the school of Luca Signorelli;
- episcopal mitre (late 17th century), embroidery with gold thread and coral, from southern Italy.

=== Third room ===
This room is almost entirely dedicated to the intellectual and artist from Arezzo, Giorgio Vasari. Of note are:

- Preaching of John the Baptist (1548), oil on canvas, by Giorgio Vasari;
- Baptism of Christ, (1548), oil on canvas, by Giorgio Vasari;
- Madonna of mercy (1560-1570), oil on canvas, by Giorgio Vasari;
- Christ at the house of Martha and Mary (1575), by Santi di Tito.

=== Fourth and fifth rooms ===
The final two rooms present works of art and liturgical objects dating from the 17th to the 19th centuries, from the cathedral and churches of the diocese. Of greatest interest are:

- liturgical vestments in purple and gold;
- three paintings (late 18th to the early 19th centuries), oil on canvas, by Pietro Benvenuti.

== Bibliography ==
- Erminia Giacomini Miari, Paola Mariani, Musei religiosi in Italia, Milano 2005, p. 241
- Stefano Zuffi, I Musei Diocesani in Italia. Secondo volume, Palazzolo sull'Oglio (BS) 2003, pp. 50 – 53

== Related links ==
- Museum web page (in Italian)
- Diocesi di Arezzo-Cortona-Sansepolcro
- Associazione Musei Ecclesiastici Italiani (in Italian)
