= Tarlati Polyptych =

Altarpiece by Pietro Lorenzetti

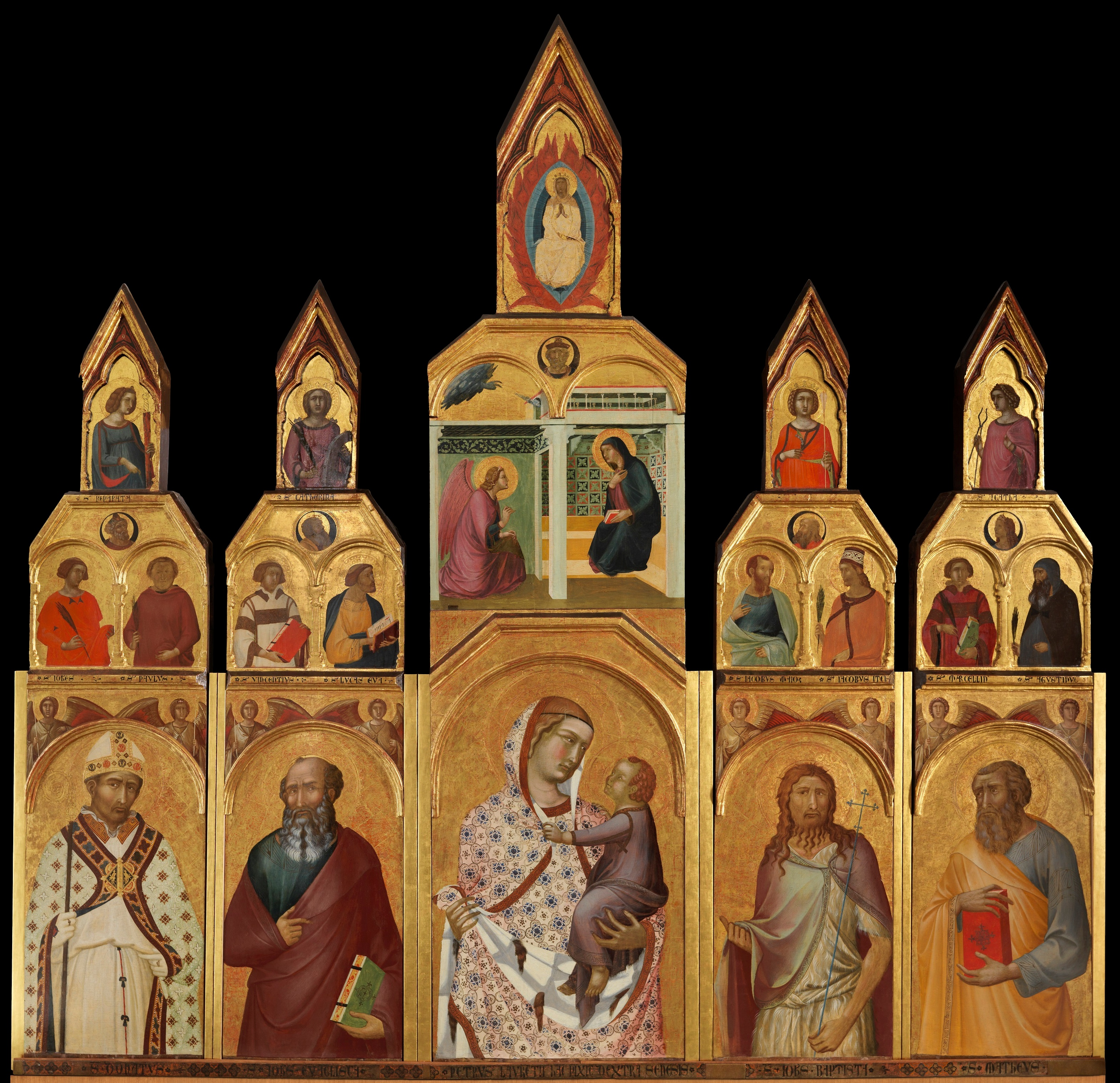
The Tarlati Polyptych

The Tarlati Polyptych is a polyptych painted by the Italian artist Pietro Lorenzetti, in tempera and gold on panel, in 1320. It is located at the church of Santa Maria della Pieve in Arezzo, Tuscany. At its centre is the Madonna (draped in a magnificent ermine-lined robe) and Child, flanked (from left to right) by the saints Donatus (Arezzo's patron saint), John the Evangelist, John the Baptist, and Matthew. The altarpiece is named after its patron Guido Tarlati, Bishop of Arezzo, who died in 1327.
