= Dante Viviani =

Italian architect

- Born: 25 July 1861; Arezzo, Kingdom of Italy
- Died: 13 October 1917 (aged 56); Perugia, Kingdom of Italy
- Education: Accademia di Belle Arti di Roma
- Occupations: Architect; Architectural restorer

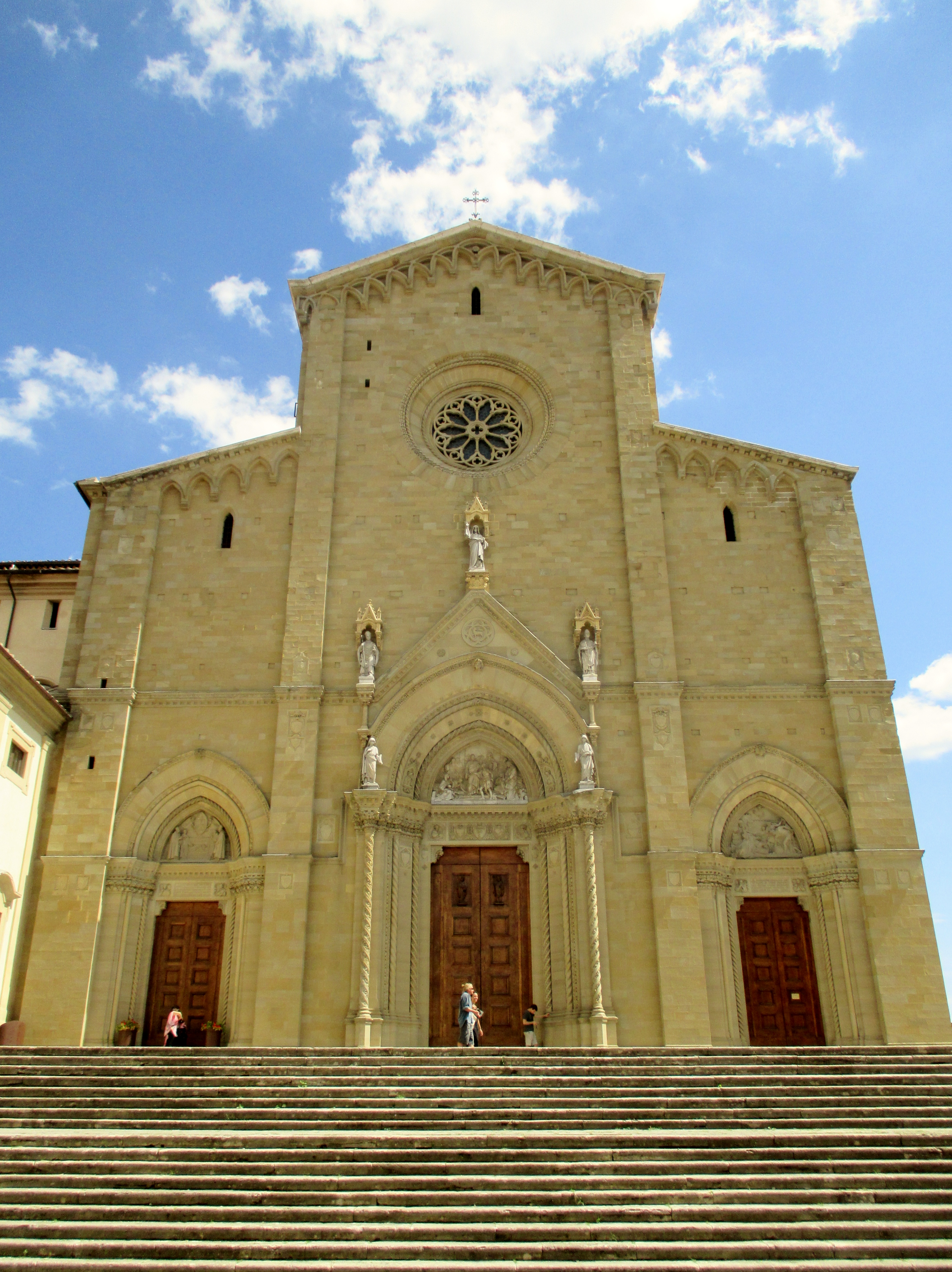
The façade of the Arezzo Cathedral

Dante Viviani (25 July 1861 – 13 October 1917) was an Italian architect, active mainly in Umbria and his native Tuscany.

== Biography ==
Born in Arezzo, Mariani graduated at the Accademia di Belle Arti di Roma, and he started working as a disciple of Gaetano Koch and Raffaello Ojetti.

He designed numerous buildings in his native Arezzo and in Umbria, and contributed to the restoration and renovation of ancient palaces and churches in old towns such as Assisi, Città di Castello, Gubbio, Perugia and Todi. Between 1901 and 1914 he designed the new façade of the Arezzo Cathedral in a Gothic Revival style.

== Bibliography ==
- F. Massetani (1942). Dizionario bibliografico degli aretini ricordevoli nelle lettere, scienze, arti, armi e religioni. Biblioteca Città di Arezzo.
