= Guillaume de Marcillat =

French painter

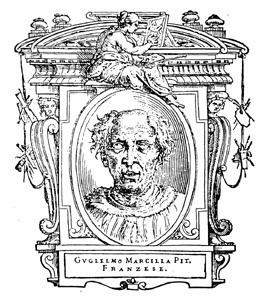
depiction of Guillaume de Marcillat, part of Giorgio Vasari's Le Vite

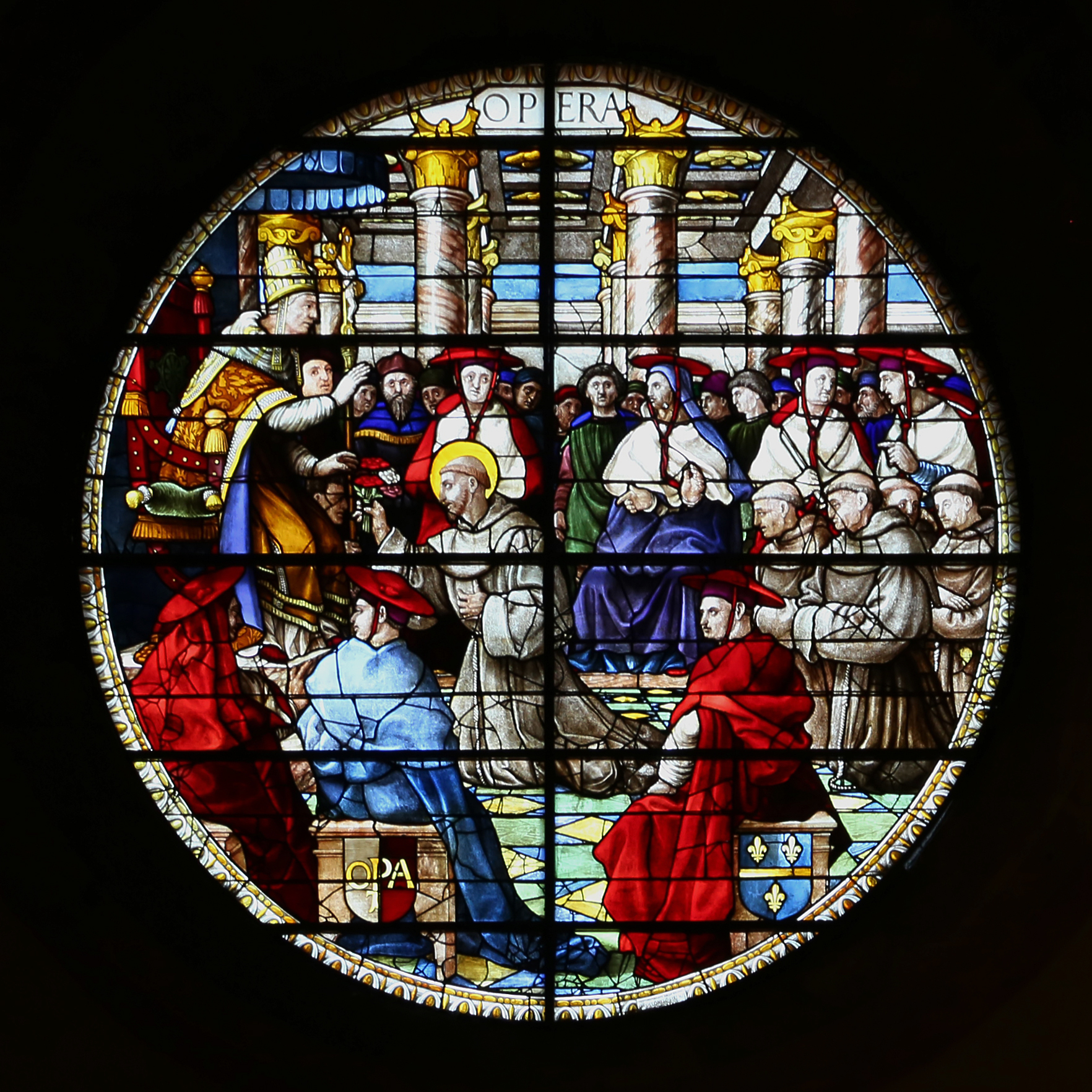
stained glass window in The Basilica of San Francesco, Arezzo, Italy, by Guillaume de Marcillat

Guillaume de Marcillat (ca. 1470–1529) was a French painter and stained glass artist.

== Biography ==
He was born in La Châtre, Indre about 1470. He was in Rome by 1509, where he was employed by the popes Julius II and Leo X in the Vatican and at Santa Maria del Popolo, where the two windows in the choir are his earliest surviving works. In 1515, he was summoned by Cardinal Silvio Passerini to Cortona, where he established a workshop, that produced stained glass windows for the Madonna del Calcinaio Cathedral. By 1519 he was in Arezzo, where he produced windows for the Cathedral of Arezzo and the Basilica of San Francesco. He also painted biblical frescos in the vault of the Cathedral of Arezzo.

He died in Arezzo, Italy in 1529.
