= Salvi Castellucci =

Italian painter (1608–1672)

Salvi Castellucci (1608–1672) was an Italian painter of the Baroque period, active mainly in Arezzo where he painted frescos on the ceiling (fourth and fifth aisles) of Arezzo Cathedral.

He trained in Rome with Pietro da Cortona. His son, Pietro Castellucci painted in his style.
