= Pier Saccone Tarlati di Pietramala =

Italian condottiero

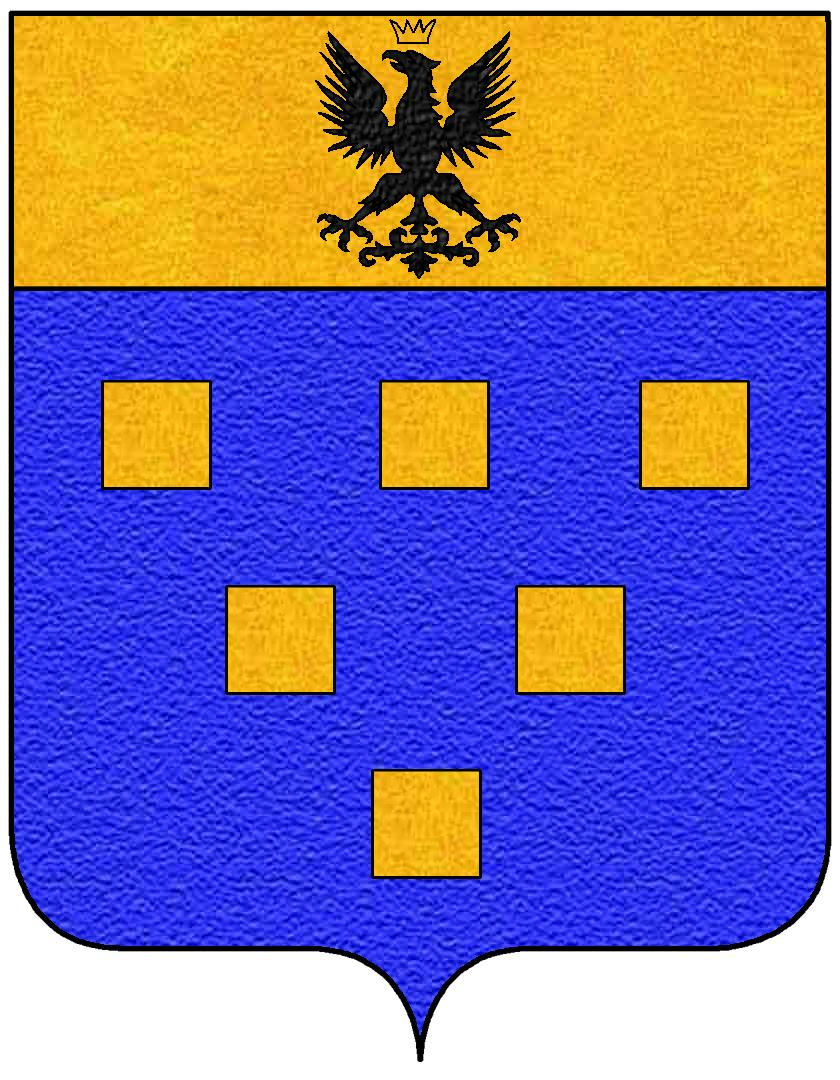
Coat of arms of the Tarlati family

Pier Saccone Tarlati di Pietramala (1261–1356) was an Italian condottiero from Pietramala d'Arezzo in the Val d'Arno, a rocca that controlled the mule track between his native town of Arezzo and Anghiari. Pietramala ("Bad rock") was the seat of the powerful family of the Tarlati, who came to prominence in the strife following Arezzo's decisive defeat at Campaldino (1289) as heads of the Ghibelline "Secchi" faction of Arezzo. Pier Saccone's brother was Guido Tarlati, bishop and signore of Arezzo.

== Military career ==
Pier Saccone, during a fighting career that lasted to his final days, held for periods of time the lordships of Anghiari, Arezzo, Città di Castello, Sansepolcro, Bibbiena, Chiusi Subbiano (surrendered in 1338 to the Fiorentine republic) and Castiglion Fiorentino, in addition to numerous smaller strongholds.

== Imperial service ==
In 1312, with his brother Tarlatino Tarlatini, he was in the retinue of Henry of Luxembourg, Holy Roman Emperor at Rome. In August 1315 he participated at the battle of Montecatini, at the head of 140 gentlemen of Arezzo. In 1320 his reputation was assured through his acquisition of numerous castelli from Guido Novello da Polenta, the host of Dante in exile. In October 1323 he was invested with Città di Castello. In February 1327 he paid court in Milan to Ludwig of Bavaria, King of Germany, who was crowned with the Iron Crown of Lombardy by his brother Guido, bishop of Arezzo; in October that year, at the death of Guido, he was made Lord of the city, for the space of one year; however, after he attended the coronation in Rome of Ludwig as Holy Roman Emperor the following January and was excommunicated in March 1328 by John XXII along with the Emperor and the major members of his party, the Emperor formally invested him as Signore of Arezzo and Città di Castello, in December, following the death of his brother, who had held the position for his lifetime. Pier Saccone's rule marked a rapid decline in the fortunes of Arezzo, which had reached their apogee under the bishop his brother.

He took Sansepolcro in March 1329, after eight months of siege and unusually high casualties, but failed to take Cortona through a conspiracy, his favoured technique. That began a series of violent encounters with forces of Florence and Perugia that ended in March 1337, when he sold the signoria of Arezzo to the Florentines, for 42,800 florins and the back payment of his troops. Thus Ghibelline Arezzo passed for the first time under the power of Guelph Florence. He and Tarlatino were received with great public honors in Florence and fought as allies of Florence in campaigns during the next years, until he failed in a Ghibelline attempt to seize power in Arezzo once more and was taken in chains to Florence, January 1342. In May Walter of Brienne, who controlled Florence, released him and restored to him his castello of Bibbiena. In June his partisans were foiled in another attempt on Arezzo, with much damage to palazzi and the city's walls and gates.

== Later campaigns ==
In the spring of 1343, following the terms of a truce between Guelfs and Ghibbeline, Pier Saccone exchanged some recently acquired castelli for Rondine. That summer, with Brienne expelled from Florence, Pier Saccone moved again to take control of Arezzo, held by Buodelmonti, who had the confidence of the Aretini. Pier Saccone ravaged the countryside round about. Capturing Castiglion Fiorentino and its rich treasury of 7,000 florins, Pier Saccone confiscated belongings and imprisoned men and women, some of whom were tortured to extort their goods. The following fighting season he turned against the forces of Perugia and came to terms again with the Florentines in 1345. His rescue from the Perugini by the brothers Brandaglia at Olmo is commemorated in a late 16th-century fresco in the salone of Palazzo Brandaglia, Arezzo. In 1351 he was in league with the Visconti, his old enemies the Ubertini and the Pazzi of Val d'Arno against the Florentine commune.

== Death and succession ==
He died at Bibbiena in 1356, and was succeeded by his son, Marco.
