= Satyrus of Arezzo =

Italian saint and bishop

Saint Satyrus of Arezzo
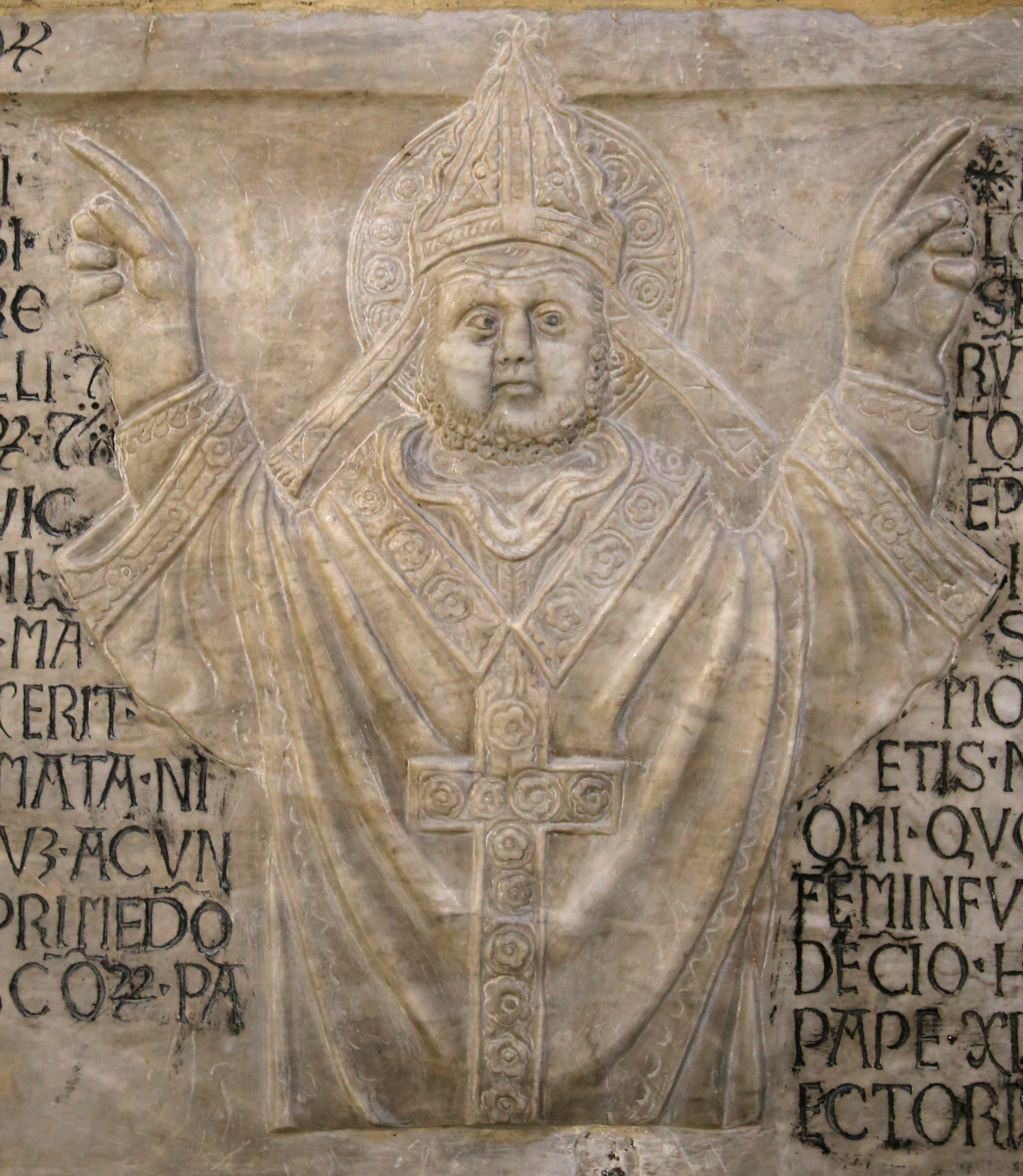

Bishop
- Died: ~304
- Venerated in: Roman Catholic Church

Saint Satyrus of Arezzo (fl. 304 AD) is venerated as the first bishop of Arezzo. The Catholic Encyclopedia states that Arezzo "became a bishopric about 304, under St. Satyrus. St. Donatus, his successor, is patron of the cathedral of St. Peter the Apostle."

He should not be confused with Satyrus of Milan, the brother of Saint Ambrose.
