= Riccardo Fontana =

Italian Roman Catholic prelate (1947–2026)

His Excellency, The Most Reverend Riccardo Giuseppe Fontana
- Archbishop-Bishop Emeritus of Arezzo-Cortona-Sansepolcro
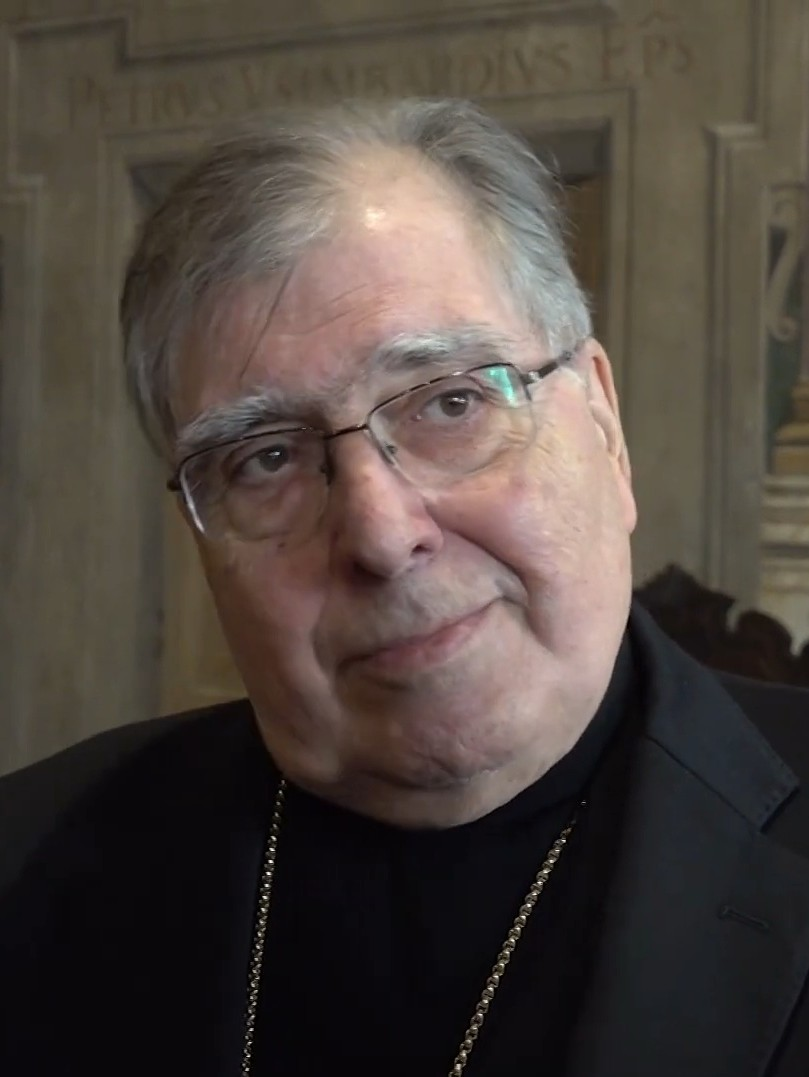
- Church: Catholic Church
- Archdiocese: Florence
- Diocese: Arezzo-Cortona-Sansepolcro
- Appointed: 16 July 2009
- Installed: 13 September 2009
- Term ended: 15 September 2022
- Predecessor: Gualtiero Bassetti
- Successor: Andrea Migliavacca
- Other post: Archbishop of Spoleto-Norcia (1995–2009)

Orders
- Ordination: 2 July 1972 by Paolo Ghizzoni
- Consecration: 6 January 1996 by Pope John Paul II, Giovanni Battista Re and Jorge María Mejía

Personal details
- Born: 20 January 1947 Forte dei Marmi, Tuscany, Italy
- Died: 9 February 2026 (aged 79) Arezzo, Tuscany, Italy
- Motto: Non recuso laborem
- Coat of arms

Styles of Riccardo Giuseppe Fontana
- Reference style: His Excellency; The Most Reverend
- Spoken style: Your Excellency
- Religious style: Archbishop

Riccardo Giuseppe Fontana (20 January 1947 – 9 February 2026) was an Italian Catholic prelate who served as Archbishop-Bishop of the Diocese of Arezzo-Cortona-Sansepolcro from 2009 until his retirement in 2022. He previously served as Archbishop of the Archdiocese of Spoleto-Norcia from 1996 to 2009.

== Early life and priesthood ==
Fontana was born on 20 January 1947 in Forte dei Marmi, in the Archdiocese of Pisa, Tuscany. He entered the diocesan seminary and was ordained a priest on 2 July 1972, marking the beginning of a long pastoral and ecclesial ministry.

== Episcopal ministry ==
On 16 December 1995, Pope John Paul II appointed Fontana as Archbishop of Spoleto-Norcia. He received episcopal consecration on 6 January 1996 in St. Peter’s Basilica.

On 16 July 2009, he was appointed Archbishop-Bishop of Arezzo-Cortona-Sansepolcro, succeeding Gualtiero Bassetti. He was installed on 13 September 2009 and guided the diocese for thirteen years, emphasizing pastoral care, priestly vocations, and diocesan unity.

Pope Francis accepted his resignation on 15 September 2022 upon reaching the canonical age limit for diocesan bishops.

== Later life and death ==
After retirement, Fontana held the title of Archbishop-Bishop Emeritus and remained active in diocesan and liturgical life. He died in Arezzo on 9 February 2026, at the age of 79.

Catholic Church titles
Preceded by Gualtiero Bassetti	Archbishop-Bishop of Arezzo-Cortona-Sansepolcro; 2009–2022	Succeeded by Andrea Migliavacca
Preceded by Antonio Ambrosanio	Archbishop of Spoleto-Norcia; 1995–2009	Succeeded by Renato Boccardo
