= Arezzo Cathedral =

Roman Catholic cathedral in Tuscany, Italy

Coordinates: 43°28′01″N 11°52′59″E

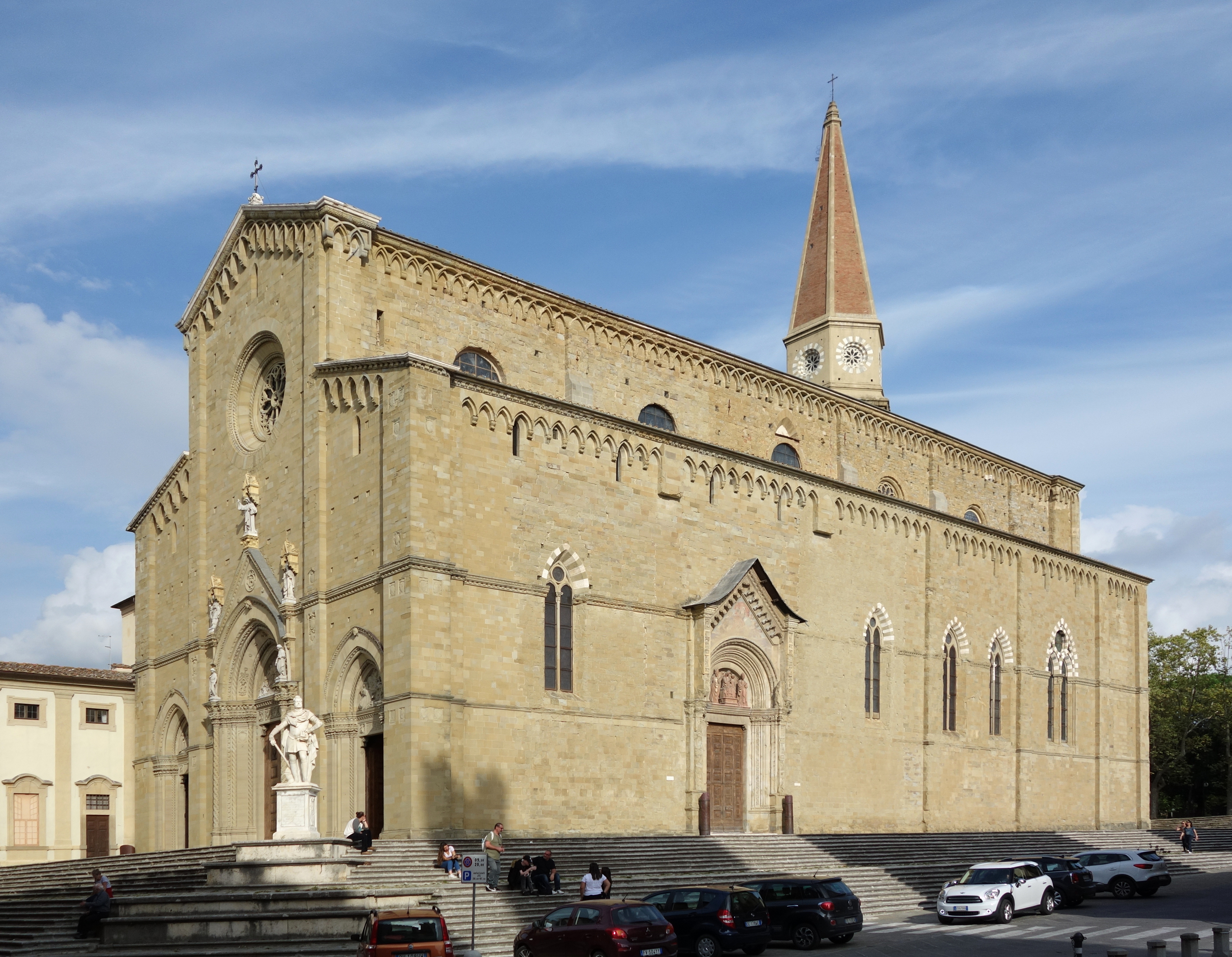
Arezzo Cathedral

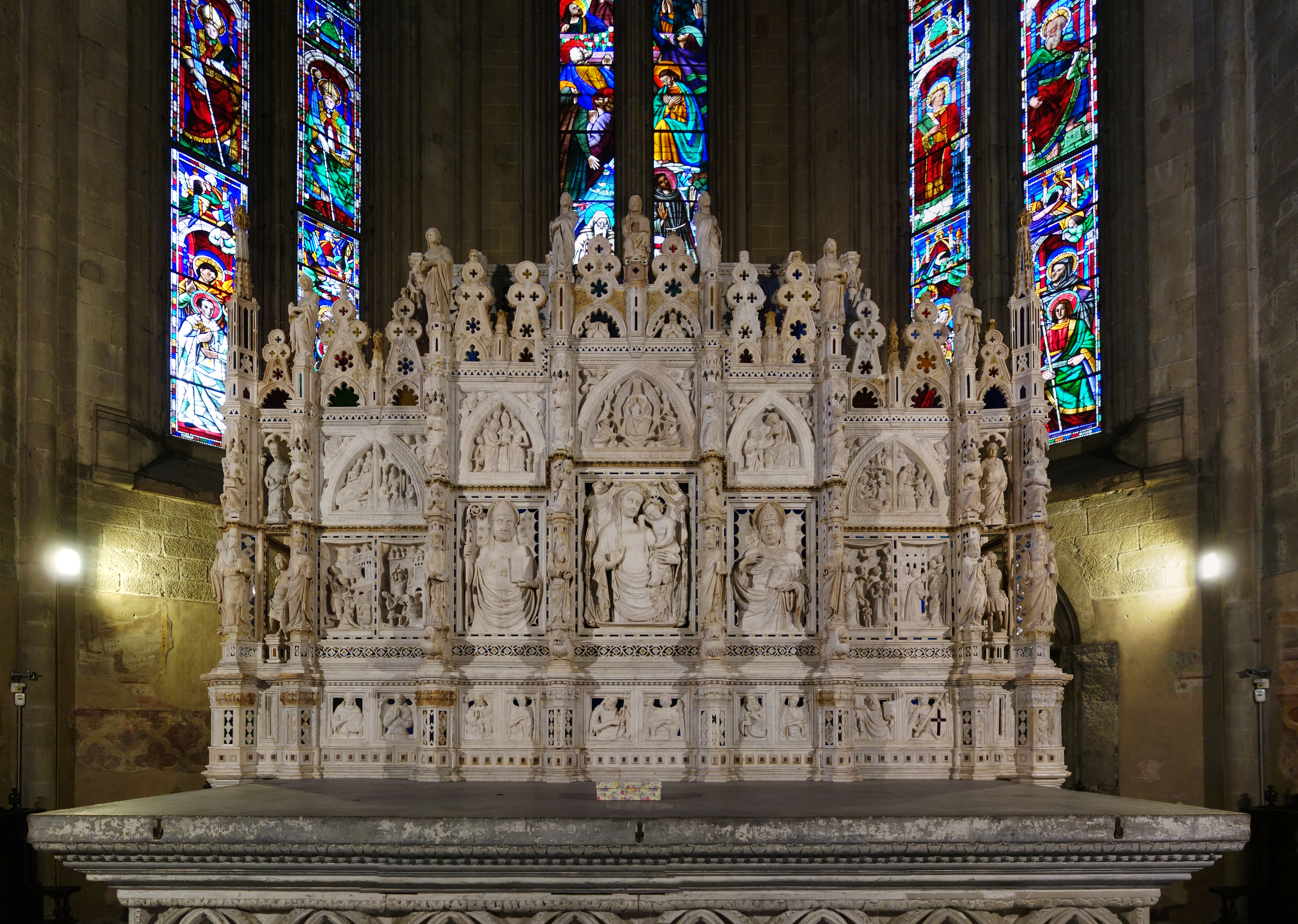
Arch of St. Donatus

Arezzo Cathedral (Italian: Cattedrale di Arezzo, Duomo di Arezzo, Cattedrale di Ss. Donato e Pietro) is a Roman Catholic cathedral in the city of Arezzo in Tuscany, Italy. It is located on the site of a pre-existing Palaeo-Christian church and, perhaps, of the ancient city's acropolis.

== History ==
The first cathedral of Arezzo was built on the nearby Pionta Hill, over the burial place of Donatus of Arezzo, martyred in 363. In 1203 Pope Innocent III had the cathedral moved within the city's walls, to the current site. The cathedral however lost the relics of Donatus, which were transferred to the church of San Donato in Castiglione Messer Raimondo (in what is now the province of Teramo). In spite of this, the cathedral is still dedicated to Saint Donatus and at the high altar houses a 14th-century arch named after him.

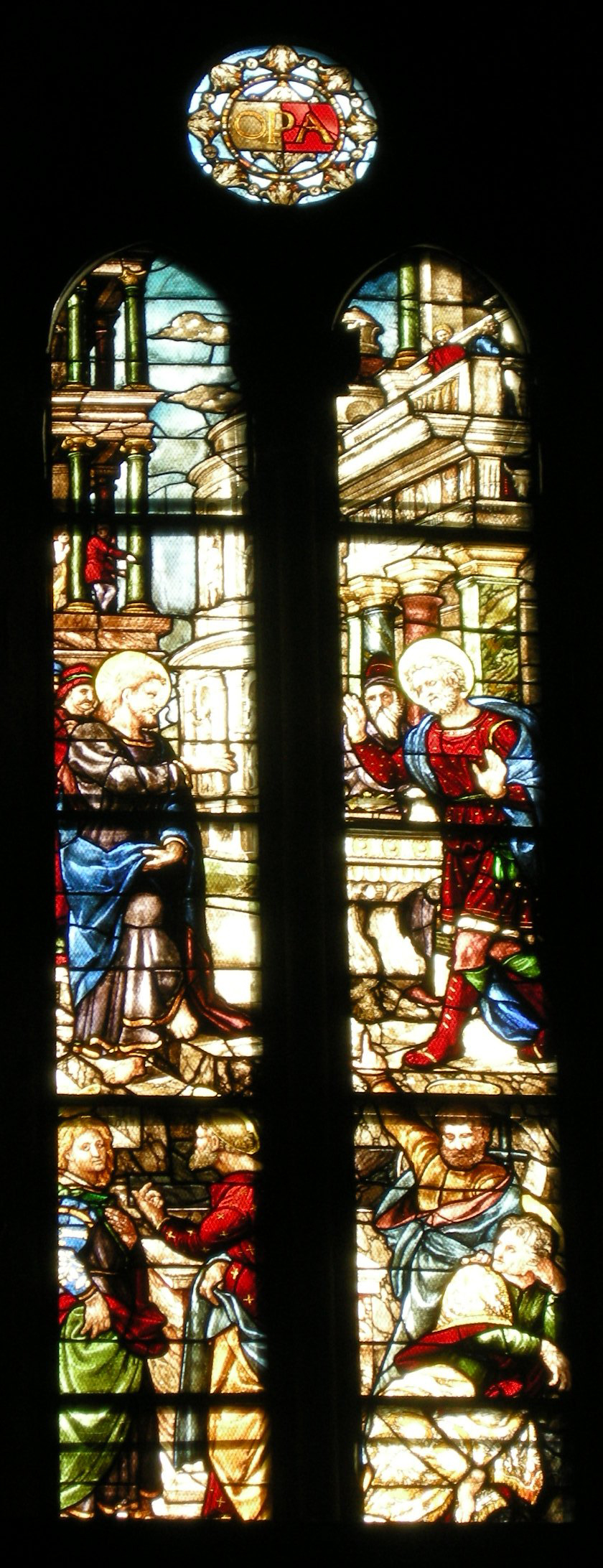
Vocation of St. Matthew, by Guillaume de Marcillat (1519-1521)

The construction of the current structure, started in 1277, went through different phases, and ended in 1511. The façade was built in 1901–1914, replacing the previous, unfinished one, dating to the 15th century.

It was the seat of the Bishop of Arezzo from the 3rd century until 1986, and from 1986 onwards has been that of the present Bishop of Arezzo-Cortona-Sansepolcro.

== Description ==
=== Exterior ===
The façade was designed by Dante Viviani and has sculpted decorations by Giuseppe Cassioli, Enrico Quattrini and Viviani himself.

The south side of the church is from the original medieval building, in sandstone. In the middle is a 14th-century portal in Florentine style, with two porphyry columns taken from an ancient temple. The polygonal apse, with double mullioned windows, dates to the 13th century.

=== Interior ===
The interior has a nave and two aisles divided by piers with ogival arches, with five spans covered by cross vaulting, without a transept. The seven stained glass windows in the south aisles were executed in 1516-1524 by Guillaume de Marcillat, who also painted frescos of biblical scenes on the ceiling. Almost a century and a half after the work of Marcillat, Salvi Castellucci completed the fresco work on the fourth and fifth aisles. Other stained glass windows are in the presbytery, one also by Marcillat and another by early 15th-century Florentine masters.

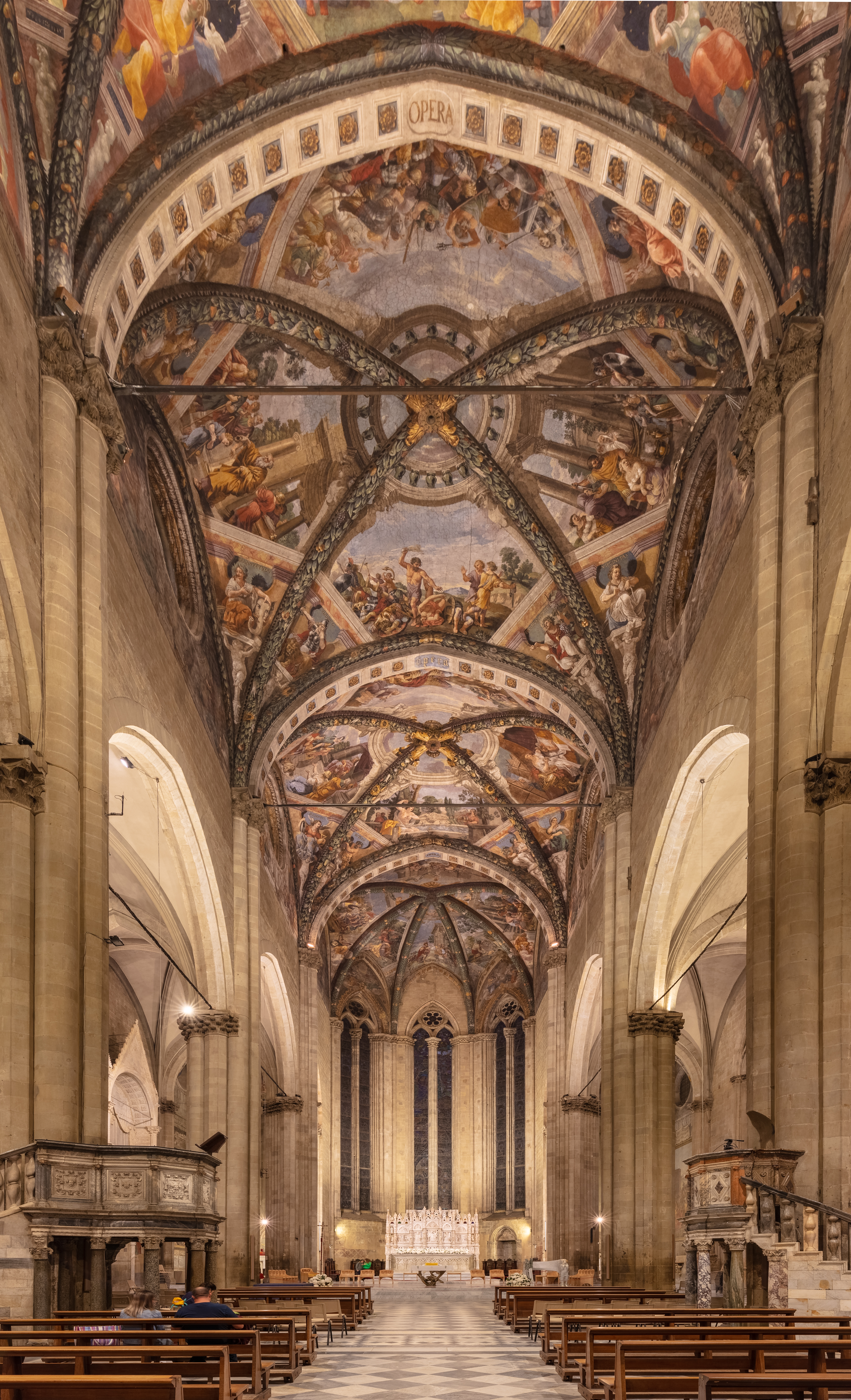
Frescos of Arezzo cathedral

The presbytery houses a large arch dedicated to Saint Donatus. Sculpted in marble, it has twelve small piers terminating in spires and pinnacles in Gothic style and was executed by Florentine, Aretine and Sienese artists of the 14th century, including (in the lower section) Agnolo di Ventura and Agostino di Giovanni. The wooden choir of the Grand Chapel was designed by Giorgio Vasari in 1554.

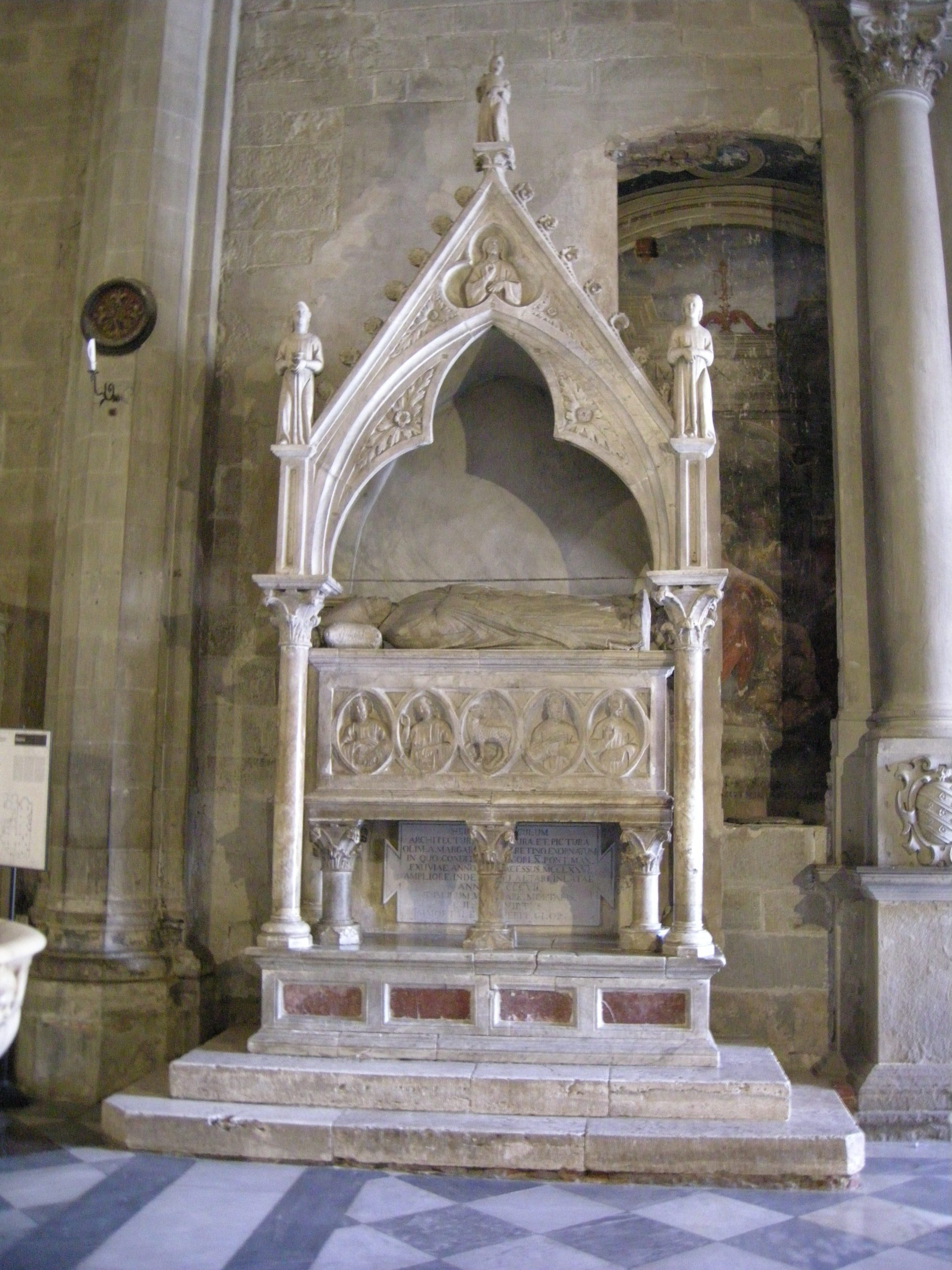
Funerary arch of Gregory X

In the counter-façade is the hexagonal baptismal font, with reliefs by Donatello's workshop, including a "Baptism of Christ" by Donatello himself.^{Ref.?} The Chapel of the Madonna del Confort is a Neoclassicist work, built from 1796 and housing several terracottas by Andrea della Robbia. In the same side is the cenotaph of Guido Tarlati, lord of Arezzo until 1327. According to some, it was designed by Giotto, and executed by Agnolo di Ventura and Agostino di Giovanni. Near to the cenotaph is Piero della Francesca's Mary Magdalene (1460s).

In the south aisle is the funerary monument of Pope Gregory X (died 1276), dating to the early 14th century. Another funerary monument in the aisles is that of Ciuto Tarlati (1334), formed by a marble sarcophagus of the 4th century AD and a series of reliefs by Agostino di Giovanni, crowned by a 14th-century fresco.

A number of liturgical objects from the cathedral can be found in the nearby diocesan museum.

== Sources ==
- Toscana. Guida d'Italia. Milan: Touring Club Italiano. 2003.
