= Satyrus =

Satyrus or Satyros may refer to:

== People ==
- Satyrus, a 5th-century BC Greek political figure, instrumental in the downfall of Cleophon
- Satyros I, also known as Satyrus, a ruler of Cimmerian Bosporus from 432 to 389 BC
- Satyros, a 4th-century BC architect who co-designed the Mausoleum of Mausolus
- Satyrus, a 4th-century BC actor who conversed with Demosthenes
- Satyrus, a 4th-century BC ruler of Heraclea, brother of Clearchus and uncle of Timotheus
- Satyrus the Peripatetic, a 3rd-century BC Greek philosopher and historian
- Satyrus of Milan, a 4th-century AD saint
- Satyrus of Arezzo, a 4th-century AD saint

== Other uses ==
- Satyrus (ape), a species of ape described in some medieval bestiaries
- Satyrus (butterfly), a genus of butterflies
- Satyrus, one of three Short Kent aircraft that were built
- Satyrus rugulosus, a species of fungus.

== See also ==
- Satyr
- Simia satyrus, the original scientific classification of the orangutan
