= Diocese of Arezzo-Cortona-Sansepolcro =

Roman Catholic diocese in Italy

Diocese of Arezzo-Cortona-Sansepolcro Dioecesis Arretina-Cortonensis-Biturgensis seu Burgi Sancti Sepulchri

Catholic
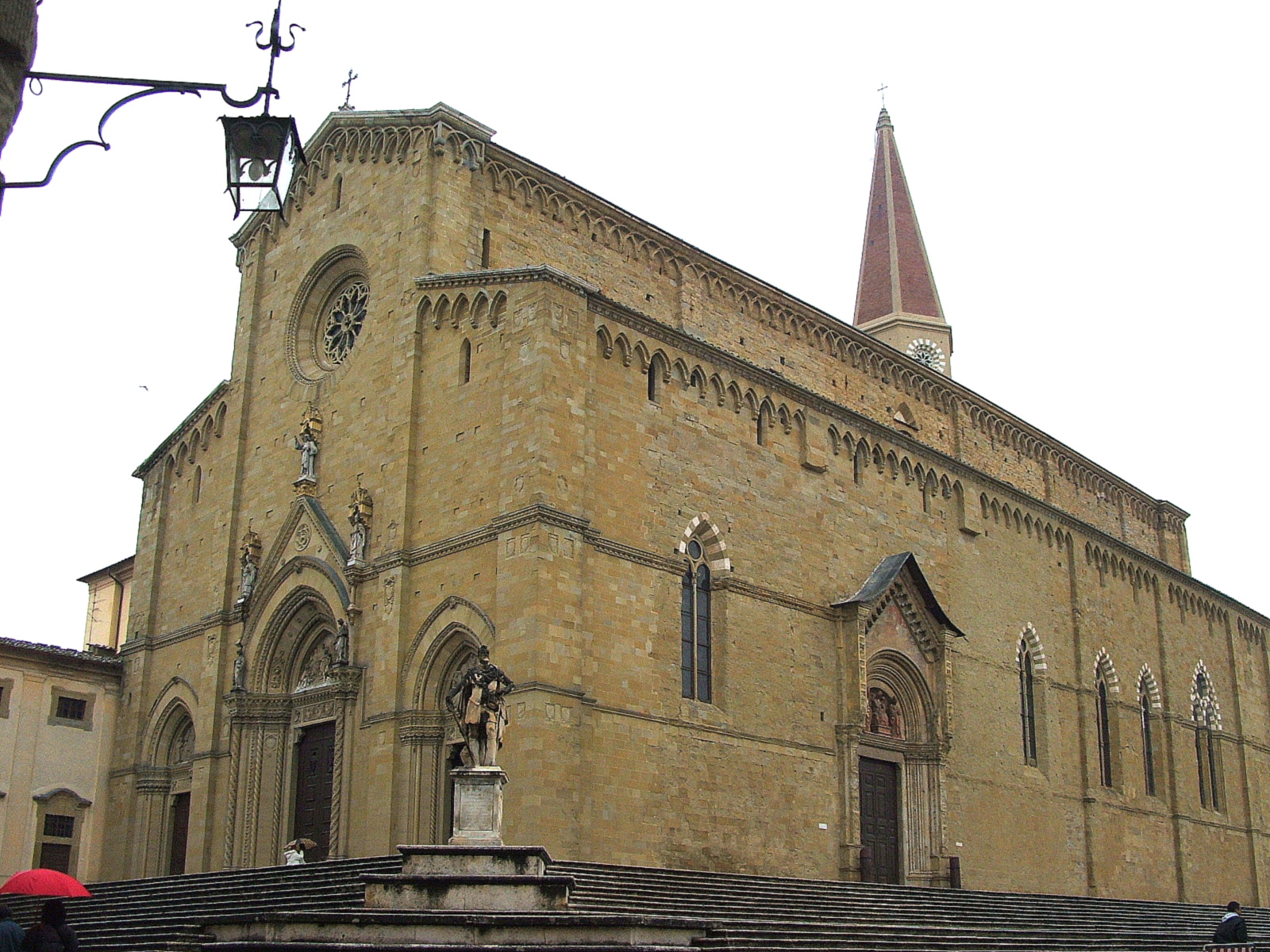
- Arezzo Cathedral

Location
- Country: Italy
- Ecclesiastical province: Florence

Statistics
- Area: 3,425 km^{2} (1,322 sq mi)
- Population: Total; Catholics: (as of 2020); 361,760; 343,835 (95.0%)
- Parishes: 246

Information
- Denomination: Catholic Church
- Rite: Roman Rite
- Established: 4th Century
- Cathedral: Cattedrale di Ss. Donato e Pietro (Arezzo)
- Co-cathedral: Concattedrale di S. Maria Assunta (Cortona); Concattedrale di S. Giovanni Evangelista (Sansepolcro)
- Secular priests: 165 (diocesan); 89 (Religious Orders); 25 Permanent Deacons

Current leadership
- Pope: Leo XIV
- Bishop: Andrea Migliavacca

Map

Website
- www.diocesi.arezzo.it

The Diocese of Arezzo-Cortona-Sansepolcro (Latin: Dioecesis Arretina-Cortonensis-Biturgensis seu Burgi Sancti Sepulchri) is a Latin diocese of the Catholic Church. It has existed since 1986. In that year the historic diocese of Arezzo was combined with the diocese of Cortona and the diocese of Sansepolcro, the enlarged diocese being suffragan of the archdiocese of Florence.

== History ==
Arezzo was the see of a diocese in Tuscany, directly dependent on the Holy See. Tradition says it was converted in the 1st century by Romulus of Fiesole, afterwards Bishop of Fiesole, a disciple of St. Paul. Another foundation tale has it that Christianity was brought to Arezzo by S. Barnabas, and by S. Timothy, the disciple of S. Paul. An equally implausible claim is that all of Arezzo was baptized during the episcopacy of Bishop Dicentius in the 5th century.

The city's clerks often helped build the church in their own free time. The church helped reward these people with seats of Cardinals. Many of the seats are still there with the names of people who had helped build and donated to the church.

It became a bishopric about 304, under Saint Satyrus. Saint Donatus, his successor, is patron of Arezzo Cathedral, also dedicated to Saint Peter the Apostle. The diocese was originally very large, embracing most of southeastern Tuscany. In 1325, however, Pope John XXII created the diocese of Cortona out of the territory of Arezzo. In 1462, Pius II created the dioceses of Pienza and Montalcino. In 1561, Pius IV created the diocese of Montepulciano. In 1515 (1520), Leo X created the diocese of Borgo San Sepolcro.

The Canons were gathered together as a corporation by Bishop Petrus, c. 840, on instructions from the Emperor Lothair. Bishop Helmpertus built new quarters for them in 1009. In 1677, the cathedral Chapter was composed of four dignities (the Provost, the Archdeacon, the Dean, and the Primicerius) and fourteen Canons.

Bishop Theodaldus (1023–1036?) invited Guido of Arezzo to train the cathedral singers in the plainchant. He dedicated his book Micrologus to Bishop Thedaldus c. 1025. A letter of Guido to Bishop Theodaldus survives, in which he explains his methodology.

Between 1480 and 1485, Luca Pacioli, O.Min., a native of Borgo San Sepolcro, which is a distance of 16 miles (25 km) from Arezzo, visited the site, and described it as "utterly stunning."

While Cardinal Guadagni was Bishop of Arezzo, he was able to obtain from his uncle, Pope Clement XII, a number of privileges for himself and Arezzo. In the bull "Insignes Ecclesias" of 1 November 1737, Pope Clement lauded the antiquity, faithfulness, and prestige of the diocese as a direct subject of the Roman Church, and conceded to its bishop in perpetuo archiepiscopal insignia, the pallium (which could only be worn inside the diocese, and on certain specified feasts and holy days) and the patriarchal cross.

=== Reorganization of the diocese ===
On 18 February 1984, the Vatican and the Italian State signed a new and revised concordat. Based on the revisions, a set of Normae was issued by the Vatican on 15 November 1984, which was accompanied in the next year, on 3 June 1985, by enabling legislation. According to the agreement, the practice of having one bishop govern two separate dioceses at the same time, aeque personaliter, was abolished. Instead, the Vatican continued consultations which had begun under Pope John XXIII for the merging of small dioceses, especially those with personnel and financial problems, into one combined diocese. In Tuscany, this particularly affected three dioceses: Arezzo, Cortona, and Borgo San Sepolcro (Biturgensis).

On 30 September 1986, Pope John Paul II ordered that the dioceses of Arezzo, Cortona, and San Sepolcro be merged into one diocese with one bishop, with the Latin title Dioecesis Arretina-Cortonensis-Biturgensis. The seat of the diocese was to be in Arezzo, and the cathedral of Arezzo was to serve as the cathedral of the merged diocese. The cathedrals in Cortona and San Sepolcro were to become co-cathedrals, and their cathedral Chapters were to be a Capitulum Concathedralis. There was to be only one diocesan Tribunal, in Arezzo, and likewise one seminary, one College of Consultors, and one Priests' Council. The territory of the new diocese was to include the territory of the former dioceses of Cortona and Borgo San Sepolcro.

== Bishops of Arezzo ==
=== to 1000 ===
- Satyrus
- Donatus (d. 362 ?)
- Gelasius

Domitianus
Severinus
Florentius
Maximianus
Eusebius

- Gaudentius

Dicentius
Laurentius
Gallius (Gallus)
Benedictus
Olibrius
Vindicianus
Cassianus
Dativus
Dulcitius
Innocentius
Maiurianus

- Servandus (c. 650)
- Cyprianus (attested 680)
- Bonushomo

Vitalianus
Alparius

- Lupartianus (attested 714, 715)

Deodatus
Aliseus (c. 735 ?)
Stabilis
Cunimundus

- Aribertus (attested 801)
- Lampertus (819–828)
- Petrus (c. 833–843)
- Petrus
- Ioannes (c. 863–900)
- Petrus (900–916)
- Theodicius

...

- Hugo (attested 952)
- Everardus (attested 963–979)
- Helmpertus (attested 994–1010)

=== 1000 to 1500 ===
- Willelmus (attested 1011−1013)
- Adalbertus (attested 1015–1021)
- Teodaldus (attested 1023–1033)
- Irenfridus (Immo) (attested 1036–1048)
- Arnaldus (attested c. 1051−1060)
- Constantinus (attested 1063–1095)
- Sigifredus (attested 1099)
- Gregorius (Gualterius) (1105−1114)
- Guido Buccatoria (1114–1128)
- Buianus (attested 1135, 1136)
- Maurus (attested 1136–1140)

Sede vacante (1142)

- Girolamo (1142– after 1173)
- Heliottus (attested 1177–1186)
- Amadeus (attested 1188–1203)
- Gregorius (1203–1212)
- Martinus (1212–1236)
- Marcellus Pete (1236–1248)
- Guillelmus dei Pazzi (1253–1289)
- Ildebrandino dei conti Guidi (1289–1312)
- Guido Tarlati (1312–1325)
- Boso Ubertini (1325–1365)
- Jacobus Muti (1365-1371)
- Joannes Albergotti (1371–1375)
- Joannes Albergotti (1375–1390)
- Antonio Arcioni (1390–1391)
- Angelo Ricasoli (1391–1403)
- Pietro Ricci (1403–1411)
- Cappone Capponi (1411–1413)
- Francesco Jacobi (Bellarmino) (1413–1433)
- Roberto degli Asini, O.E.S.A. (1434–1456)
- Filippo de' Medici (1457–1461)
- Lorenzo Acciaiuoli (1461–1473)
- Gentile de' Becchi (1473–1497)
- Cosimo de' Pazzi (1497–1508)

=== 1500 to 1800 ===
Cardinal Raffaele Sansone Riario (1508–1511) Administrator

- Girolamo Sansoni (1511–1519)
- Ottaviano Maria Sforza (1519–1525 Resigned)
- Francesco Minerbetti (1525–1538 Resigned)
- Bernardetto Minerbetti (1538–1574)
- Stefano Bonucci (1 Oct 1574 – 2 Jan 1589)
- Pietro Usimbardi (9 Jan 1589 – 28 May 1612)
- Antonio Ricci (1611–1637)
- Tommaso Salviati (1 Mar 1638 – 15 Oct 1671)
- Cardinal Neri Corsini (8 Feb 1672 – 7 Mar 1677 Resigned)
- Alessandro Strozzi (8 Mar 1677 – 19 Oct 1682)
- Giuseppe Ottavio Attavanti (24 May 1683 – 9 Jan 1691)
- Giovanni Matteo Marchetti (19 Dec 1691 – Sep 1704)
- Benedetto Falconcini (15 Dec 1704 – 6 Mar 1724)
- Giovanni Antonio Guadagni, O.C.D. (20 Dec 1724 – 4 Nov 1732 Resigned)
- Francesco Guidi (1733–1734)
- Carlo Filippo Incontri (1734–1753)
- Jacopo Gaetano Nicolò Inghirami (17 Mar 1755 – 20 May 1772)
- Angelo Franceschi (13 Nov 1775 –1778
- Niccolò Marcacci (14 Dec 1778 – 1 Jan 1799)

Sede vacante (1799–1802)

=== since 1800 ===
- Agostino Albergotti (20 Sep 1802 – 6 May 1825)
- Sebastiano Maggi (1827–1839)

Sede vacante (1839–1843)

- Attilio Fiascaini (1843–1860)

Sede vacante (1860–1867)

- Giuseppe Giusti (22 Feb 1867 – 1891 Resigned)
- Donnino Donnini (14 Dec 1891 – 18 Oct 1904)
- Giovanni Volpi (14 Nov 1904 – 3 Jul 1919 Resigned)
- Emanuele Mignone (18 Dec 1919 – 23 Dec 1961)
- Telesforo Giovanni Cioli, O. Carm. (23 Dec 1961 Succeeded – 11 Apr 1983 Retired)
- Giovanni D'Ascenzi (11 Apr 1983 – 8 Jun 1996 Retired)

== Bishops of Arezzo-Cortona-Sansepolcro ==
- Flavio Roberto Carraro, O.F.M. Cap. (8 Jun 1996 – 25 Jul 1998 Appointed, Bishop of Verona)
- Gualtiero Bassetti (21 Nov 1998 – 16 Jul 2009 Appointed, Archbishop of Perugia-Città della Pieve)
- Riccardo Fontana (16 Jul 2009 – 15 Sep 2022 Retired)
- Andrea Migliavacca (15 Sep 2022 – )

== See also ==
- Timeline of Arezzo
- Diocesan museum of sacred art (Arezzo)

== Books ==
- Gams, Pius Bonifatius (1873). Series episcoporum Ecclesiae catholicae: quotquot innotuerunt a beato Petro apostolo. Ratisbon: Typis et Sumptibus Georgii Josephi Manz. p. 743. (Use with caution; obsolete)
- Eubel, Conradus, ed. (1913). Hierarchia catholica (in Latin). Vol. Tomus 1 (second ed.). Münster: Libreria Regensbergiana.
- Eubel, Conradus, ed. (1914). Hierarchia catholica (in Latin). Vol. Tomus 2 (second ed.). Münster: Libreria Regensbergiana.
- Eubel, Conradus; Gulik, Guilelmus, eds. (1923). Hierarchia catholica (in Latin). Vol. Tomus 3 (second ed.). Münster: Libreria Regensbergiana.
- Gauchat, Patritius (Patrice) (1935). Hierarchia catholica (in Latin). Vol. Tomus IV (1592-1667). Münster: Libraria Regensbergiana.
- Ritzler, Remigius; Sefrin, Pirminus (1952). Hierarchia catholica medii et recentis aevi (in Latin). Vol. Tomus V (1667-1730). Patavii: Messagero di S. Antonio.
- Ritzler, Remigius; Sefrin, Pirminus (1958). Hierarchia catholica medii et recentis aevi. Vol. Tomus VI (1730-1799). Patavii: Messagero di S. Antonio.
- Ritzler, Remigius; Sefrin, Pirminus (1968). Hierarchia Catholica medii et recentioris aevi (in Latin). Vol. VII (1800–1846). Monasterii: Libreria Regensburgiana.
- Remigius Ritzler; Pirminus Sefrin (1978). Hierarchia catholica Medii et recentioris aevi (in Latin). Vol. VIII (1846–1903). Il Messaggero di S. Antonio.
- Pięta, Zenon (2002). Hierarchia catholica medii et recentioris aevi (in Latin). Vol. IX (1903–1922). Padua: Messagero di San Antonio. ISBN 978-88-250-1000-8.

=== Studies ===
- Bougard, François (2012). "I vescovi di Arezzo nei secoli IX-XI", (in Italian) in G. Cherubini, F. Barlucchi, G. Firpo (edd.), Arezzo nel medioevo (Roma: G. Bretschneider), pp. 63–71.
- Bresslau, H. (1880). "Chronik des Capitels zu Arezzo." in: Neues Archiv Der Gesellschaft Für Ältere Deutsche Geschichtskunde 5 (Hannover: Hahn 1880) pp. 442–451. (in German and Latin)
- Bullarum diplomatum et privilegiorum sanctorum romanorum pontificum taurinensis (in Latin). Vol. Tomus IV. Turin (Augusta Taurinorum): Seb. Franco et Henrico Dalmazzo editoribus. 1859. pp. 312–315.
- Cappelletti, Giuseppe (1864). Le chiese d'Italia (in Italian). Vol. decimotto (18). Venezia: G. Antonelli. pp. 1–179.
- Hofmeister, Adolf (ed.) (1934). Series episcoporum Aretinorum, in: Monumenta Germaniae Historica, Scriptores, Tomus XXX, pars II. Leipzig 1934, pp. 1438–1441. (in Latin)
- Kehr, Paul Fridolin (1908). Italia pontificia. vol. III. Berlin 1908. pp. 144–196. (in Latin)
- Lanzoni, Francesco (1927), Le diocesi d'Italia dalle origini al principio del secolo VII (an. 604), Faenza 1927, pp. 567–573. (in Italian)
- Pasqui, Angiolo; Pasqui, Ubaldo (1880). La Cattedrale aretina e suoi monumenti Arezzo : Tip. E. Bellotti. (in Italian)
- Pasqui, Ubaldo (1899). Documenti per la storia della città di Arezzo nel medio evo (in Italian and Latin). Vol. primo. Firenze: Presso G. P. Vieusseux. Volume secondo. Firenze R. Deputazione di storia patria. 1916. Volume terzp. Firenze R. Deputazione di storia patria. 1916.
- Schwartz, Gerhard (1913), Die Besetzung der Bistümer Reichsitaliens unter den sächsischen und salischen Kaisern : mit den Listen der Bischöfe, 951-1122, Leipzig-Berlin 1913, pp. 199–203. (in German)
- Tafi, Angelo (1986). I vescovi di Arezzo dalle origini della diocesi (sec. III) ad oggi. Cortona: Calosci. (in Italian)
- Ughelli, Ferdinando; Coleti, Nicolò (1717). Italia sacra: sive De episcopis Italiae et insularum adjacentium, rebusque abiis praeclare gestis... (in Latin). Vol. Tomus primus (secunda ed.). Venice: apud Sebastianum Coleti. pp. 402–436.

== Co-cathedrals ==
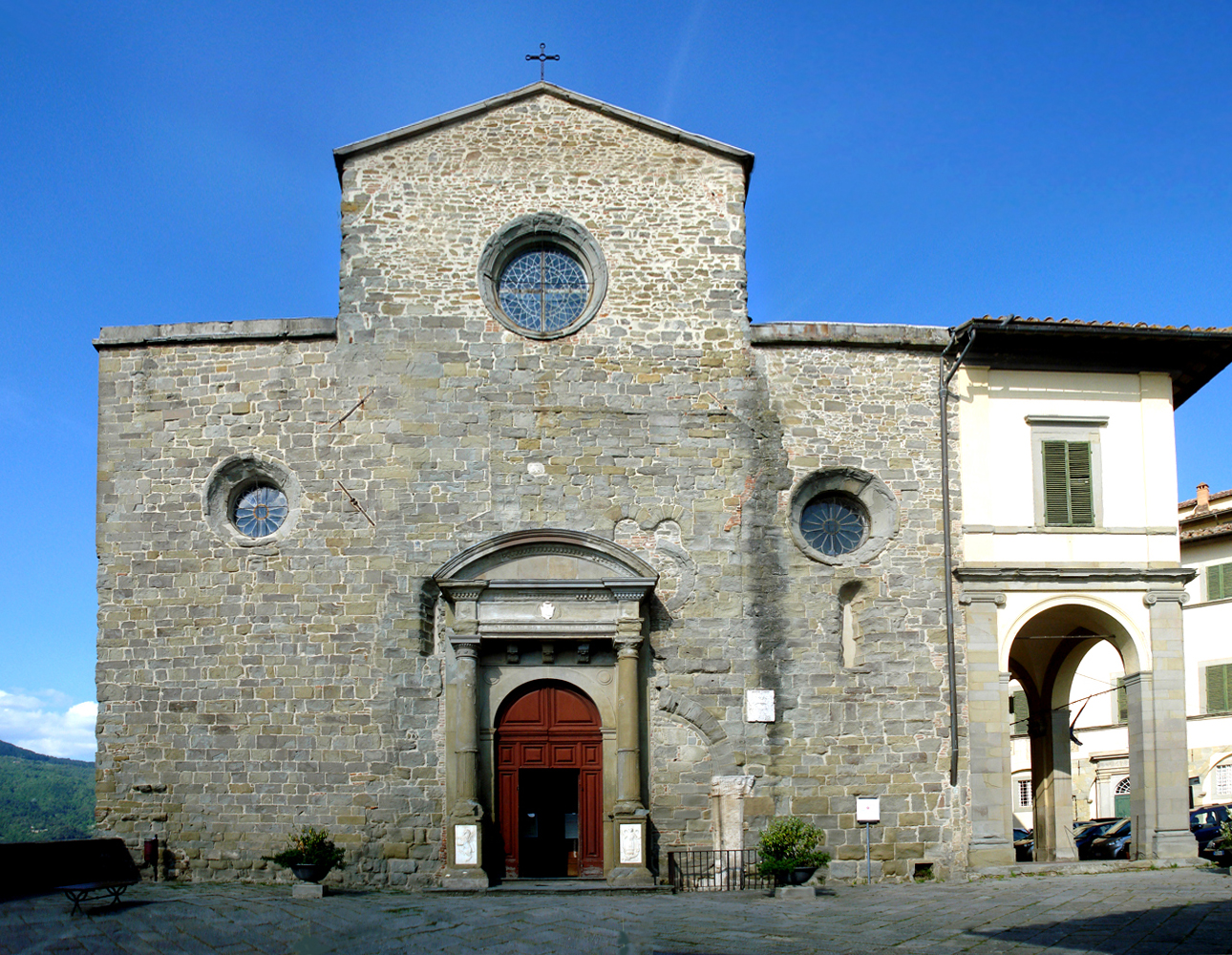
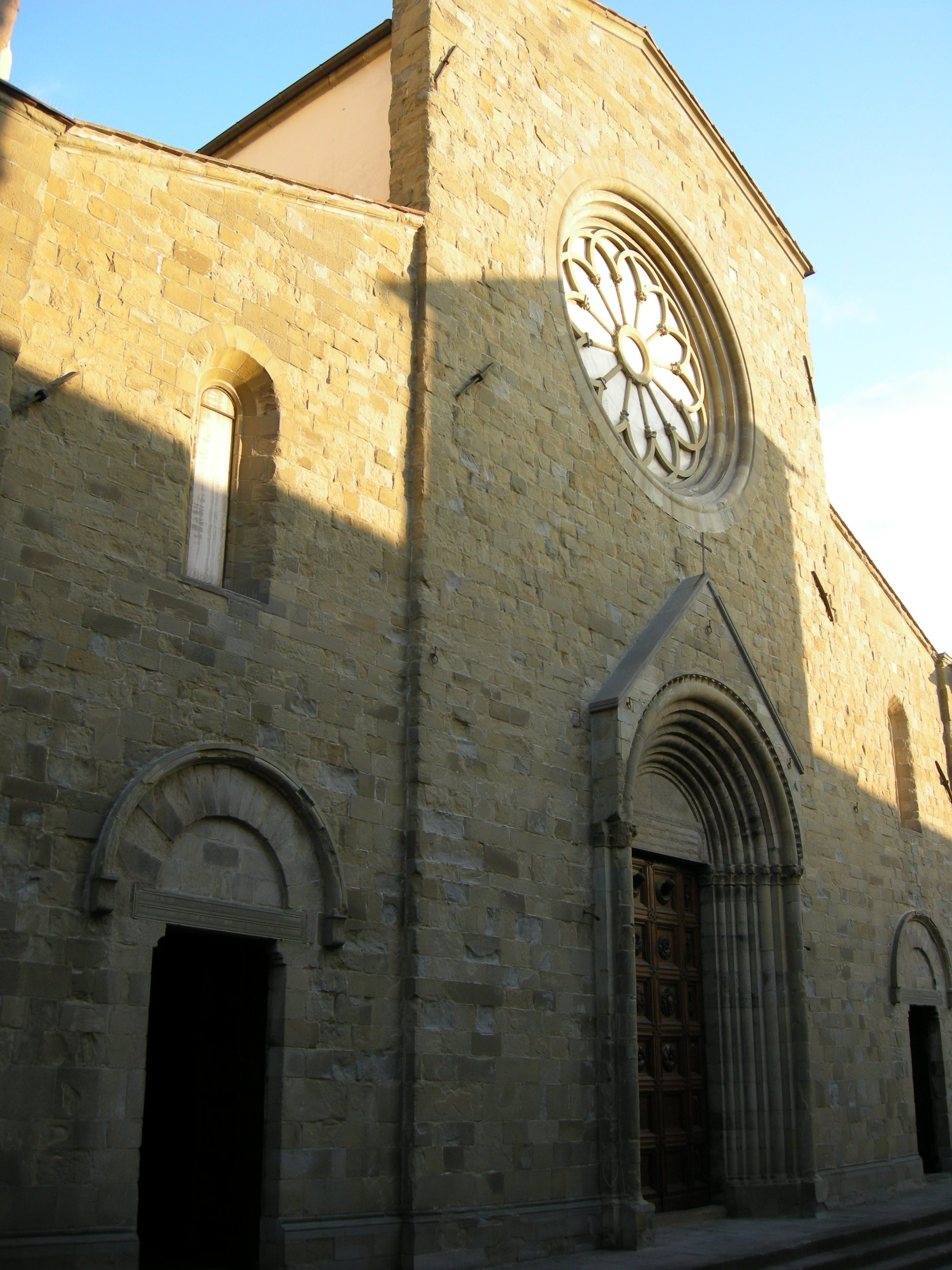
Cortona Cathedral (left) Sansepolcro Cathedral (right)
