= Alessandro Strozzi (bishop of Arezzo) =

Most Reverend Alessandro Strozzi
- Bishop of Arezzo
- Church: Catholic Church
- Diocese: Diocese of Arezzo
- In office: 1677–1682
- Predecessor: Neri Corsini
- Successor: Giuseppe Ottavio Attavanti

Orders
- Consecration: 21 Mar 1677 by Neri Corsini

Personal details
- Born: 1631 Florence, Italy
- Died: 19 Oct 1682 (age 51) Arezzo, Italy

Alessandro Strozzi (1631–1682) was a Roman Catholic prelate who served as Bishop of Arezzo (1677–1682).

== Biography ==
Alessandro Strozzi was born in Florence, Italy in 1631. On 8 Mar 1677, he was appointed during the papacy of Pope Innocent XI as Bishop of Arezzo. On 21 Mar 1677, he was consecrated bishop by Neri Corsini, Bishop Emeritus of Arezzo, with Carlo Vaini, Titular Archbishop of Nicaea, and Prospero Bottini, Titular Archbishop of Myra, serving as co-consecrators. He served as Bishop of Arezzo until his death on 19 Oct 1682.

Catholic Church titles
Preceded by Neri Corsini	Bishop of Arezzo; 1677–1682	Succeeded by Giuseppe Ottavio Attavanti
