= Satyricon (disambiguation) =

Satyricon is an ancient Roman novel attributed to Petronius Arbiter.

Satyricon may also refer to:

- Fellini Satyricon, a 1969 film by Federico Fellini based on Petronius' book
- Satyricon (1969 Polidoro film), a 1969 film by Gian Luigi Polidoro based on Petronius' book
- Satyricon (band), a Norwegian black metal band
  - Satyricon (Satyricon album), 2013 self-titled album by the band
- Satyricon (nightclub), a defunct Portland, Oregon, nightclub germinal to the Pacific Northwest punk movement
- Satyricon (Meat Beat Manifesto album) by Meat Beat Manifesto
- Satyricon (opera), an opera by Bruno Maderna
- Satyricon (theatre), a theatre in Moscow

== See also ==
- Satirikon, a Russian weekly magazine of satire and humor published 1908–1918
