= Donatus of Arezzo =

Bishop of Arezzo

Saint Donatus of Arezzo
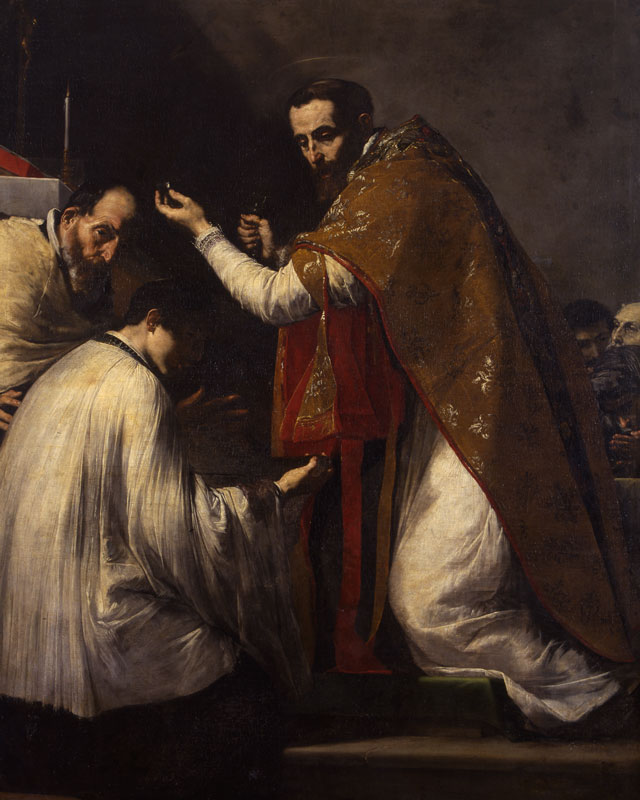
- The Miracle of Saint Donatus by Jusepe de Ribera, Musée de Picardie.

Bishop and martyr
- Born: Nicomedia (modern-day İzmit, Kocaeli, Turkey)
- Died: ~August 7, 362? Arezzo (modern-day Italy)
- Venerated in: Roman Catholic Church; Eastern Orthodox Church
- Major shrine: Arezzo; Murano
- Feast: August 7 (Catholicism); July 4 (Orthodoxy)
- Attributes: episcopal dress; Communion chalice; sword; fighting a dragon
- Patronage: Arezzo; epileptics; bakers; Contursi Terme, Acerno, Anzi, Bomba, Castel di Ieri, Castel del Monte, Fossacesia, Guardiagrele, Pinerolo, Pontelandolfo, Ranzo, San Donato di Lecce, Montesano Salentino, San Donato di Ninea, San Donato Milanese, San Donato Val di Comino, Soveria Simeri, Val della Torre, Villa Martelli, Monteforte Cilento (Salerno)

Saint Donatus of Arezzo (Italian: San Donato di Arezzo) is the patron saint of Arezzo, and considered a bishop of the city.

A Passio of Donatus' life was written by a bishop of Arezzo, Severinus; it is of questionable historicity. He calls Donatus a martyr, though Donatus is described as a bishop and confessor of the faith in ancient sources rather than as a martyr. An early hagiography of Donatus was already known to Gregory the Great.

According to tradition, Donatus was martyred on August 7, 362 during the reign of Julian the Apostate and was a native of Nicomedia.

== Legend ==
According to Severinus’ account, as a child Donatus came to Rome with his family from Nicomedia. He was orphaned, in this early account, during a persecution, and named by the bishop of Arezzo. The Latin name Donatus translates into English as donated. By Severinus' narrative, Donatus was educated by a Christian priest named Pymenius (Pimenio); his friend and companion in these religious studies was a boy named Julian –who would later become Emperor Julian the Apostate. Julian rose to the position of subdeacon; Donatus became a lector. Saint Peter Damian would later write in his Sermones that "in the field of the Lord two sprigs, Donatus and Julian, grow together, but one will become a cedar of Paradise, the other coal for the eternal flames of Hell."

On 4 February 362, Julian promulgated an edict to guarantee freedom of religion. This edict proclaimed that all the religions were equal before the law, and that the Roman Empire had to return to its original religious eclecticism, according to which the Roman State did not impose any religion on its provinces. Christian chroniclers considered that it had as its purpose the restoration of paganism at the expense of Christianity. Catholic tradition states that Julian also persecuted individual Christians, and that Donatus’ parents, as well as his teacher Pymenius, would die during these persecutions. Donatus escaped to Arezzo and would work with a monk named Hilarinus to preach the Christian faith, as well as perform penances and miracles. Severinus' Passio states that Donatus brought back to life a woman named Euphrosina; fought and slew a dragon who had poisoned the local well; gave sight back to a blind woman named Syriana; and exorcised a demon that had been tormenting Asterius, the son of the Roman prefect of Arezzo.

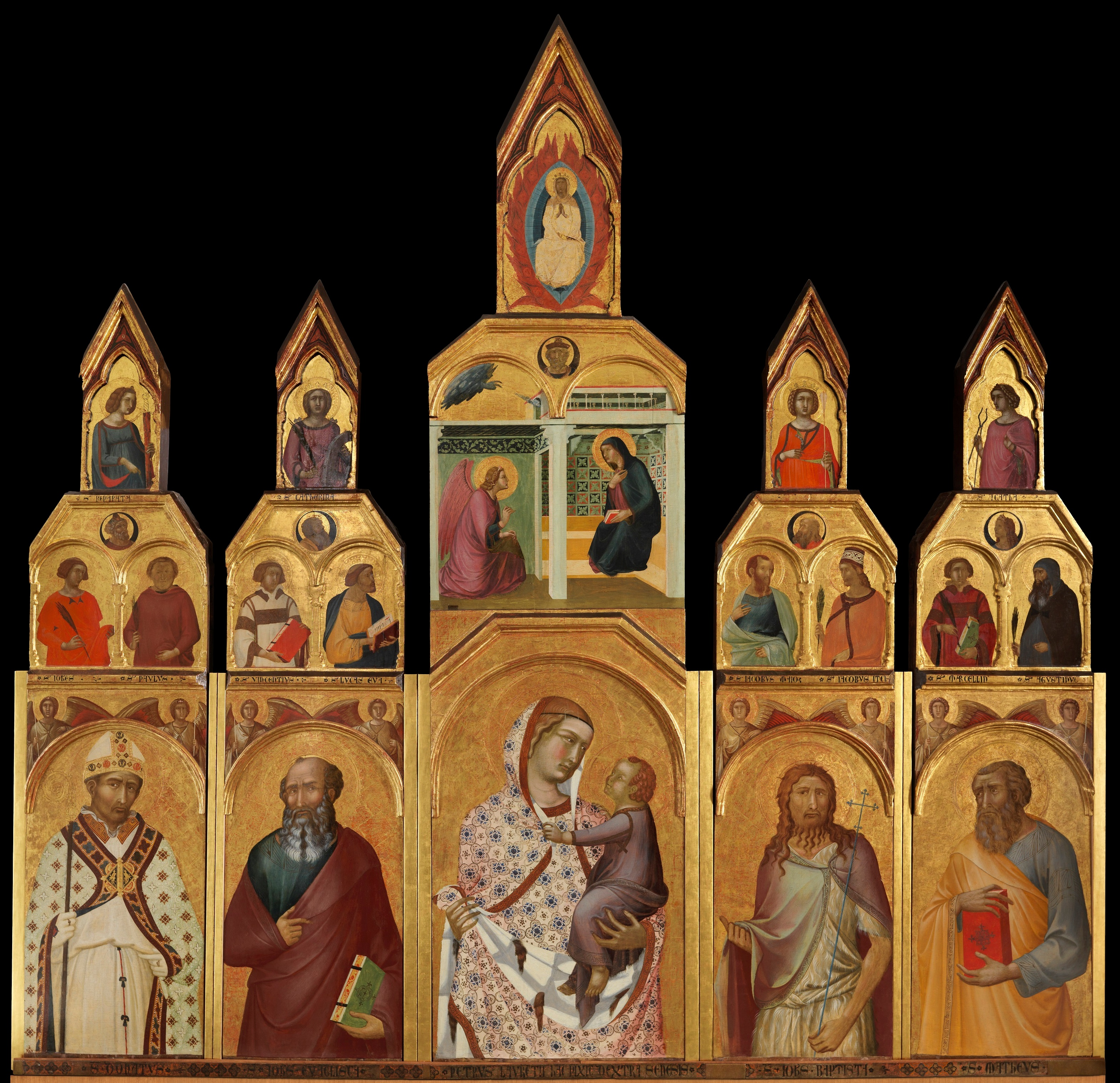
The Tarlati polyptych by Pietro Lorenzetti, at the Church of Santa maria della Pieve in Arezzo, 1320, includes St. Donatus, far left.

Donatus was ordained a deacon and priest by Saint Satyrus of Arezzo, bishop of that city, and continued to preach in the city and in the surrounding region. At the death of Satyrus, Donatus was appointed a bishop by Pope Julius I. A man named Anthimus was Donatus' deacon.

During a celebration of Mass, at the moment of the giving of Communion, in which a glass chalice was being administered, some pagans entered the church and shattered the chalice in question. Donatus, after intense prayer, collected all of the fragments and joined them together. There was a piece missing from the bottom of the cup; miraculously, however, nothing spilled from the cup. Astounded, seventy-nine pagans converted to Christianity. A similar legend is told of Saint Nonnosus, but the object is a shattered glass lamp.

A month after this episode, the prefect of Arezzo, Quadratian, arrested Hilarinus the Monk and Donatus. Hilarinus was martyred on July 16, 362 and Donatus was beheaded on August 7 at Arezzo.

== Veneration ==
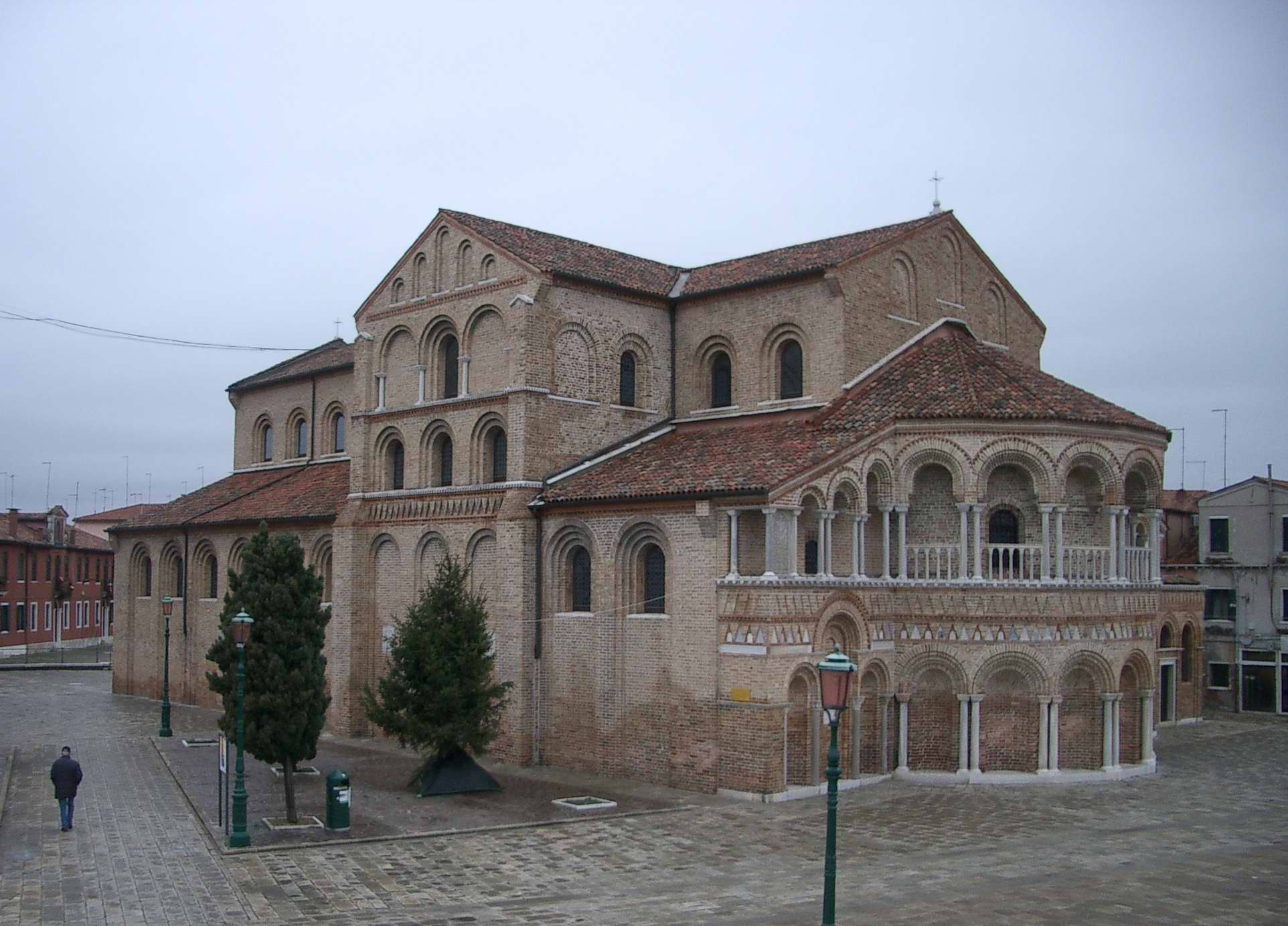
Church of Santa Maria e San Donato

In 1125, some of Donatus' relics (and those of the alleged dragon said to have been killed by the saint) were brought to the Church of Santa Maria e San Donato on the island of Murano, near Venice.

A large silver reliquary bust of Donatus from the 13th century is now found in the National Museum at Naples.

The patron saints of Guardiagrele are Donatus of Arezzo and Saint Emidius. Annually between the 6th and 8 August there is a festival celebrating these saints in which the effigy of Donatus is paraded around the streets of Guardiagrele. It is traditional to eat porchetta (oven- or spit-roasted suckling pig flavoured with pepper, rosemary, garlic and other seasonings) at this time.
