= Saint Marcellina =

Sister of Saint Ambrose of Milan

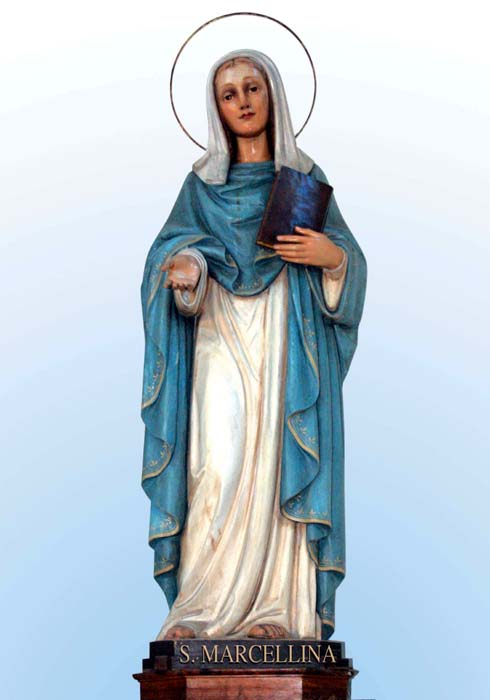
- Statue of Saint Marcellina

Virgin
- Born: 327; Trier, Gaul
- Died: 398
- Venerated in: Catholic Church, Eastern Orthodox Church
- Feast: July 17

Marcellina (c. 327 – 397) was born in Trier, Gaul the daughter of the Praetorian prefect of Gaul, and was the elder sister of Ambrose of Milan and Satyrus of Milan. Marcellina devoted her life as a consecrated virgin to the practice of prayer and asceticism. Her feast is on 17 July.

== Life ==
Marcellina was born in Trier, Gaul around the year 330 into a Roman Christian family. Her father served as Praetorian prefect of Gaul. The sister of Ambrose of Milan, she was older than her two brothers. About the year 354 Ambrosius, their father, died, whereupon the family moved to Rome. It appears that after the death of their parents, she took responsibility for the upbringing of her younger brothers, Ambrose and Satyrus.

As the eldest in her family, she made it a point to pass to her younger brothers the "desire not to express their virtue, but to become truly virtuous." She devoted herself to the practice of piety and asceticism, and received the veil of consecrated virginity from Pope Liberius. This life she led called for continual abstinence, dedication to prayer, strict fasting, etc. She lived a life of great austerity, which Ambrose tried to persuade her to mitigate. According to tradition, she turned the family home into a church dedicated in Mary, which later became Sant'Ambrogio della Massima.

After Ambrose had become Bishop of Milan in 374, he summoned his sister, and found in her a zealous assistant in fostering and extending the ascetic life among the maidens of Milan. Ambrose dedicated his work on virginity, written in 377, Libri III de virginibus ad Marcellinam to her. In his discourse on the death of his brother Satyrus, Ambrose speaks of the warm family affection which bound the three together, and of his sister's grief.

Paulinus the Deacon, who wrote a biography of Ambrose at the request of Augustine of Hippo, learned the details of Ambrose's life from Marcellina.

Marcellina survived her brother by a year, dying in 398. Honored as a saint, she was buried in the crypt under the altar of the Ambrosian Basilica in Milan.

== Legacy ==
The Institute St. Marcellina was established in 1955 in Hampstead, London in honor of her. The institute, run by the Sisters of St. Marcellina, is a residence for foreign students.
