= Satyrus of Milan =

Saint

Saint Satyrus of Milan
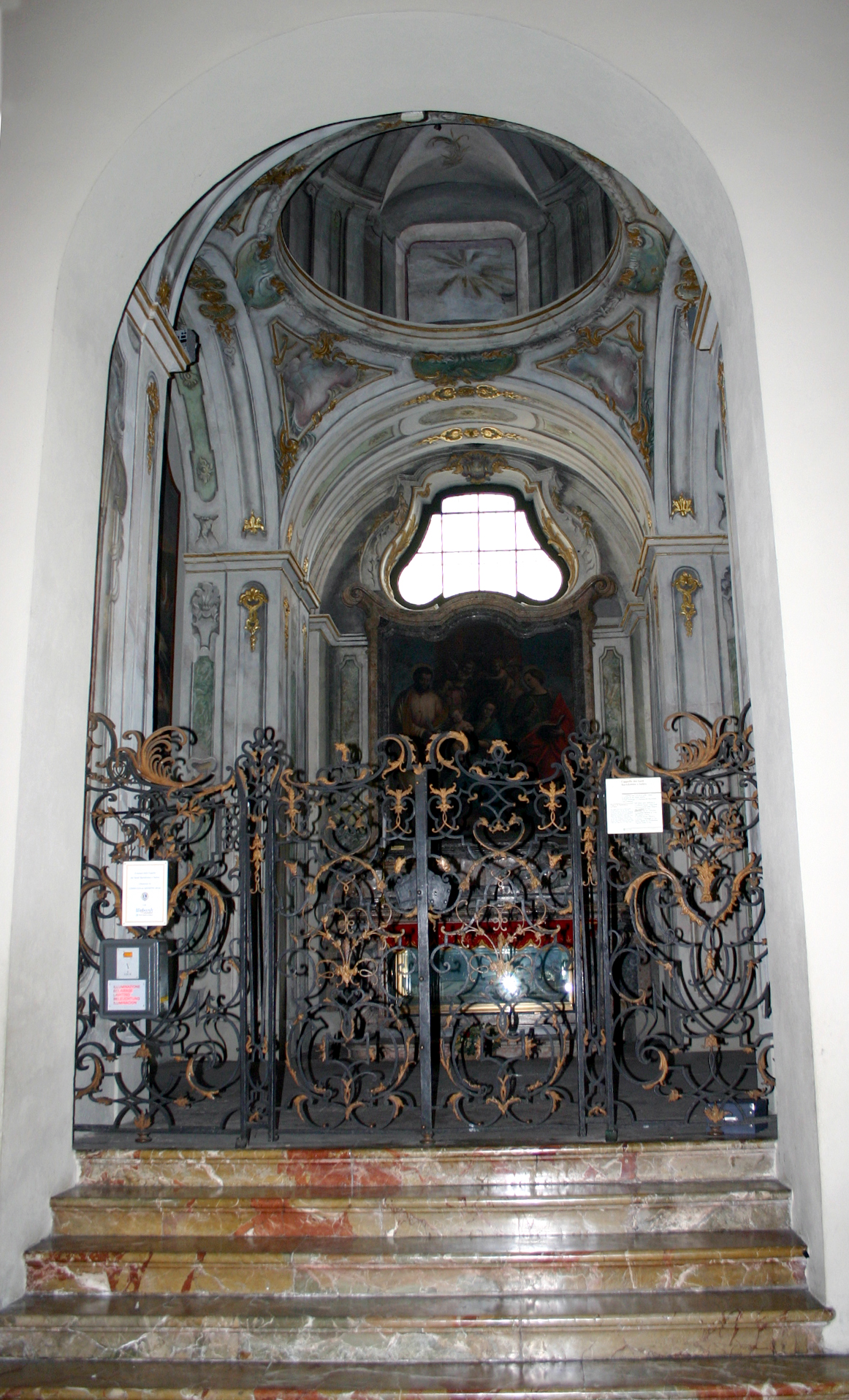
- Right-side nave of Sant'Ambrogio basilica in Milan, Italy. Saint Bartholomew and Saint Satyrus baroque-style chapel. It preserves the relics of Satyrus.
- Born: around 331; Trier, Germany
- Died: 378; Milan, Italy
- Venerated in: Roman Catholic Church
- Major shrine: Basilica of Sant'Ambrogio, Milan
- Feast: September 17
- Patronage: sacristans of the Archdiocese of Milano

Satyrus of Milan (Italian: San Satiro) was an Italian Catholic administrator born in Augusta Treverorum, who was the brother of Ambrose of Milan and Marcellina.

He was born around 331 at Augusta Treverorum (modern Trier, Germany), moved to Rome with his family and was subsequently trained as a lawyer.

Appointed prefect to one of the Roman provinces, he resigned his post when Ambrose became Archbishop of Milan in order to assume administration of the secular affairs of the archdiocese.

He died unexpectedly at Milan in 378 and was eulogised by his brother with the funeral sermon, On the Death of a Brother (De excessu fratris Satyri). The church of Santa Maria presso San Satiro in Milan refers to him.

== See also ==
- Satyrus (disambiguation)
- Santa Maria presso San Satiro
