= Arezzo =

- Comune
- Comune di Arezzo
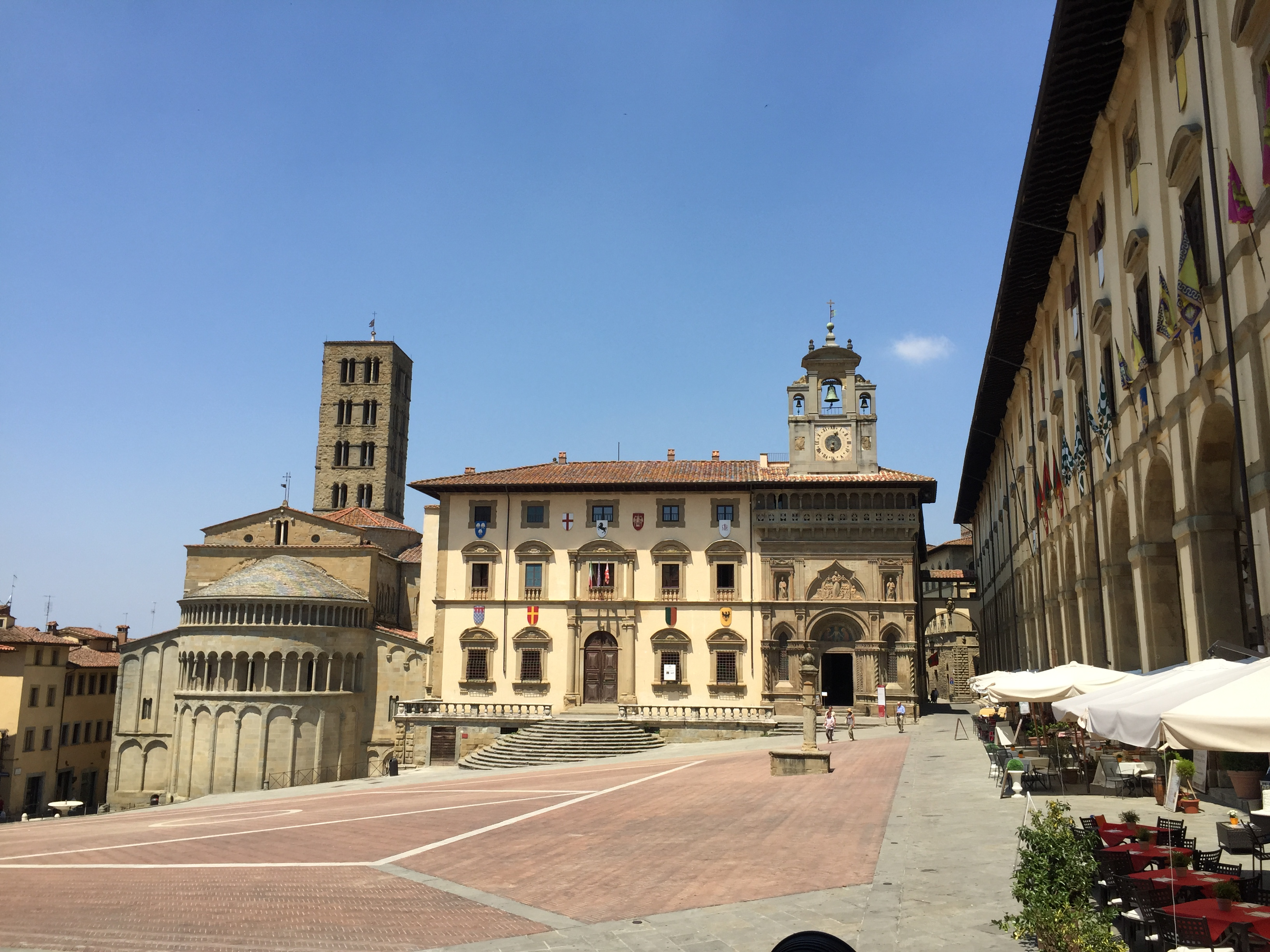
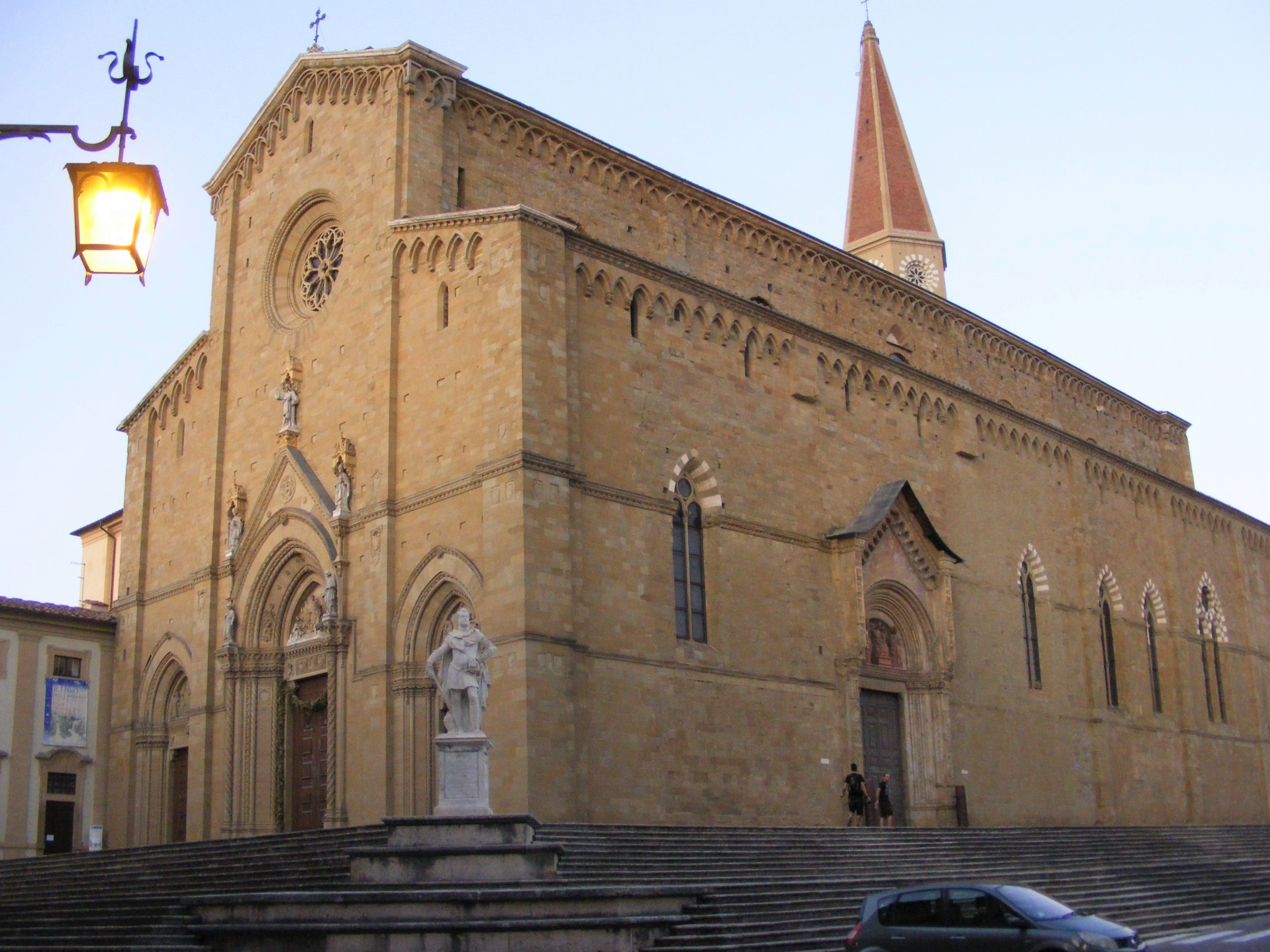
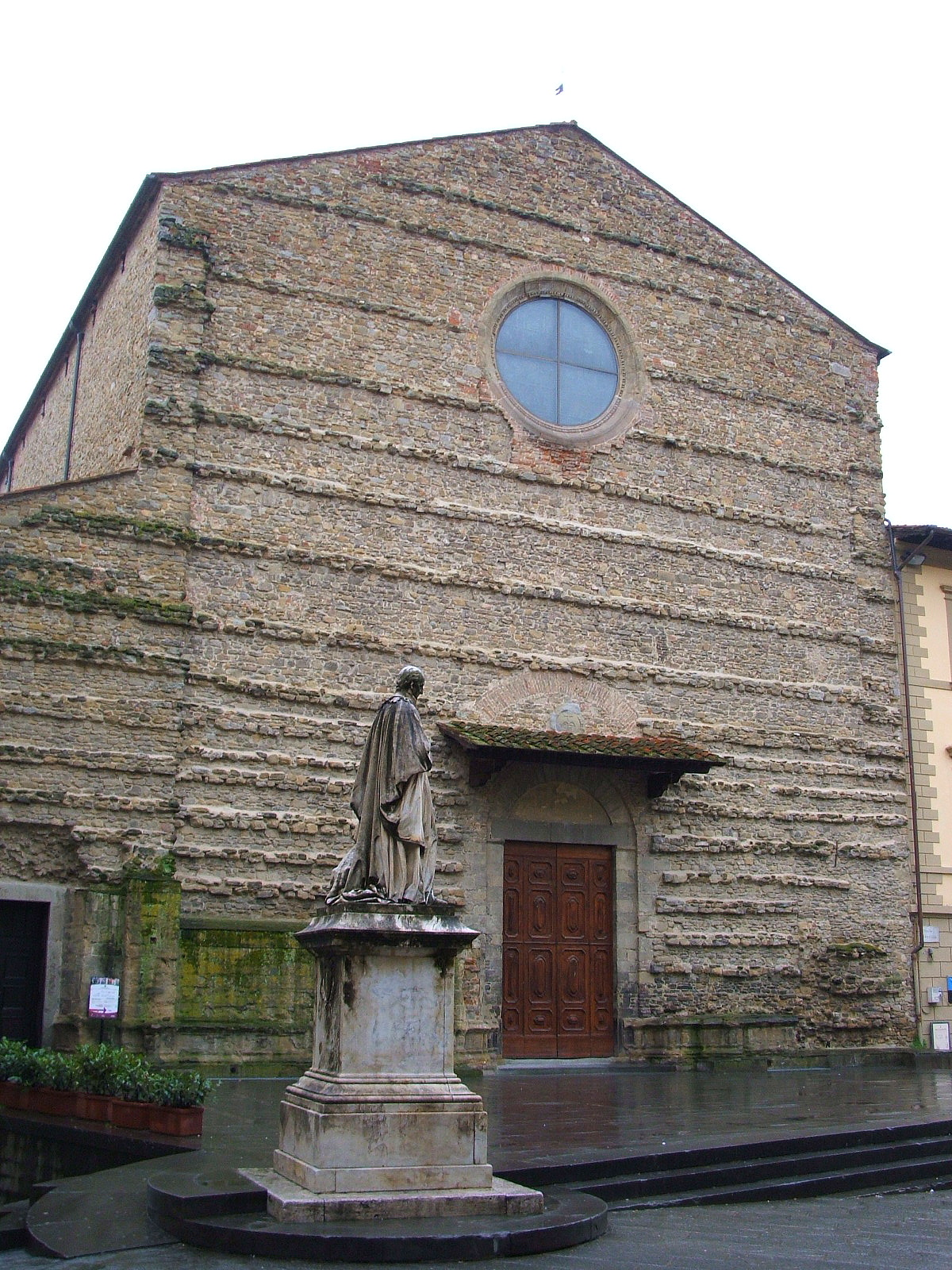
- Piazza Grande Arezzo Cathedral Basilica of San Francesco

- Flag Coat of arms

- Location within Tuscany Location within Italy
- Coordinates: 43°27′48″N 11°52′42″E
- Country: Italy
- Region: Tuscany
- Province: Arezzo (AR)
- Frazioni: see list

Government
  - Mayor: Marcello Comanducci

Area
  - Total: 384.70 km^{2} (148.53 sq mi)
- Elevation: 296 m (971 ft)

Population (2026)
  - Total: 96,506
  - Density: 250.86/km^{2} (649.73/sq mi)
- Demonym: Aretini
- Time zone: UTC+1 (CET)
  - Summer (DST): UTC+2 (CEST)
- Postal code: 52100
- Dialing code: 0575
- Patron saint: Saint Donatus of Arezzo
- Saint day: 7 August
- Website: Official website

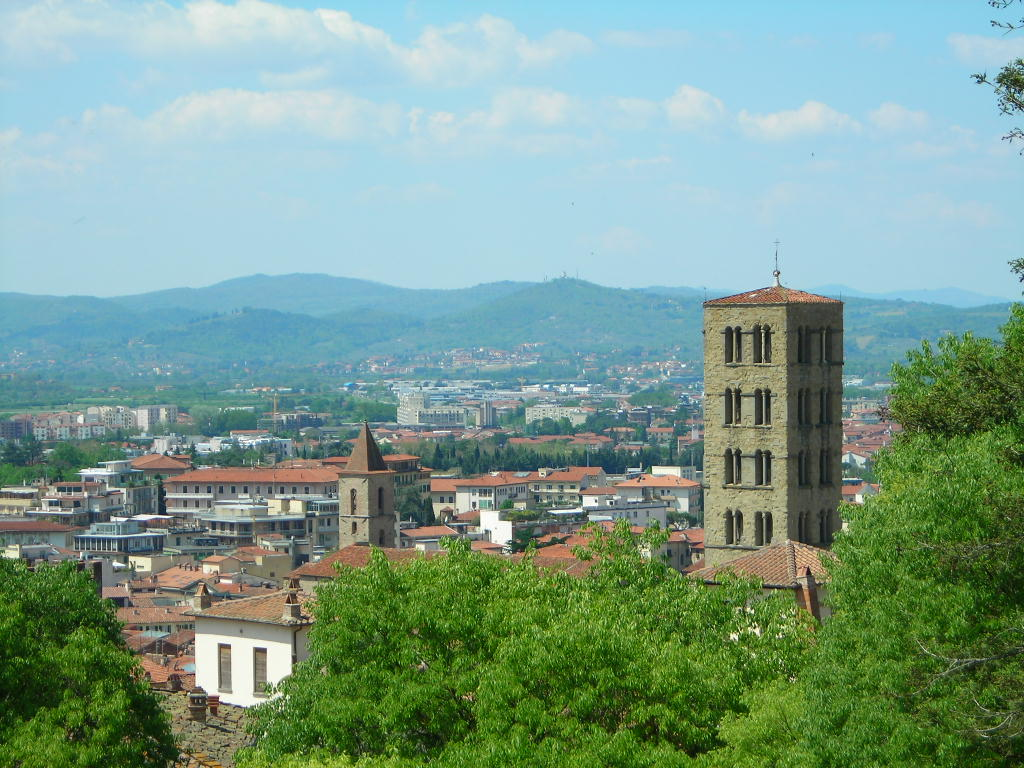
View of Arezzo

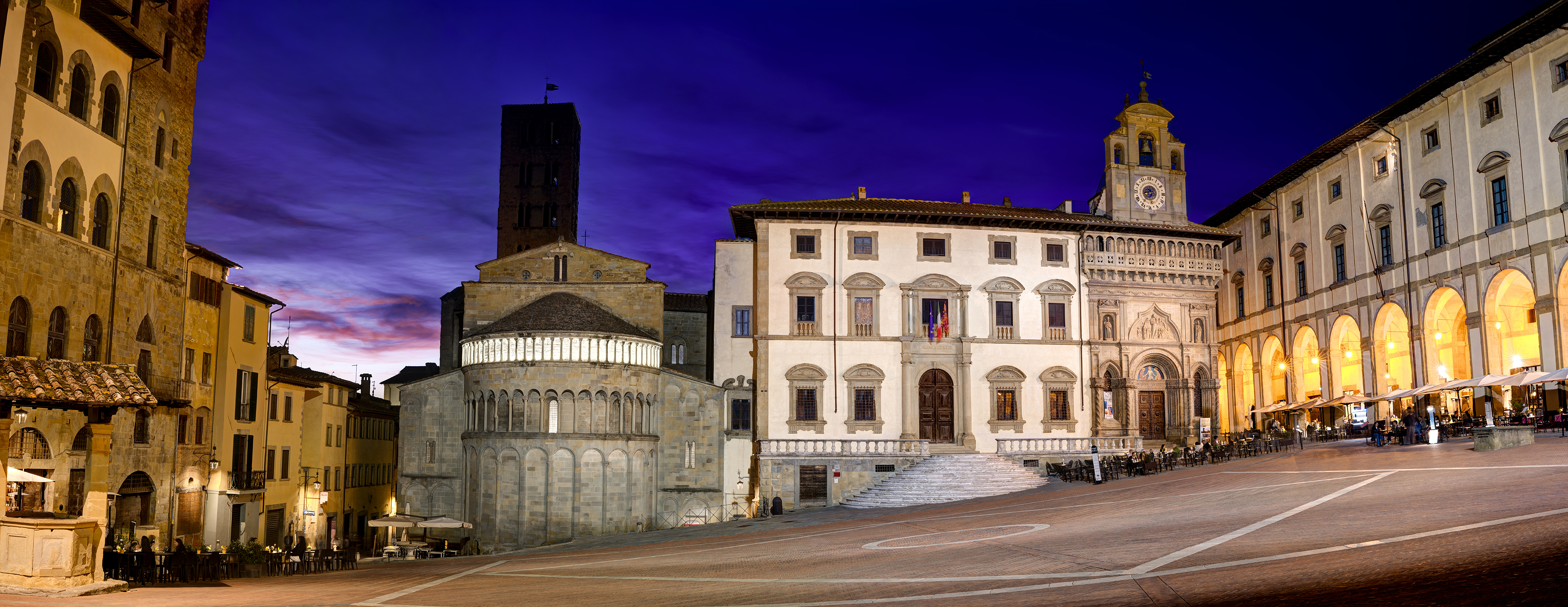
Piazza Grande at twilight

Arezzo (UK: /əˈrɛtsoʊ, æˈr-/ ə-RET-soh, arr-ET-soh, US: /ɑːˈr-/ ar-ET-soh; Italian: [aˈrettso]) (Note: Latin: Arretium [arˈreːti.ũː], also Aretium [aːˈreːti.ũː]; Etruscan: 𐌀𐌓𐌉𐌕𐌉𐌌, romanized: Aritim.) is a city and comune (municipality) and the capital of the province of the same name in the region of Tuscany in Italy. Arezzo is about 80 kilometres (50 miles) southeast of Florence at an elevation of 296 metres (971 ft) above sea level. With a population of 96,506 as of 2026, it is the 4th-largest city in Tuscany and the 48th-largest in Italy.

Known as the city of gold and of the high fashion, Arezzo was home to artists and poets such as Giorgio Vasari, Guido of Arezzo and Guittone d'Arezzo and in its province to Renaissance artist Michelangelo. In the artistic field, the city is famous for the frescoes by Piero della Francesca inside the Basilica of San Francesco, and the crucifix by Cimabue inside the Basilica of San Domenico. The city is also known for the important Giostra del Saracino, a game of chivalry that dates back to the Middle Ages.

== History ==
Described by Livy as one of the Capita Etruriae (Etruscan capitals), Arezzo (Aritim in Etruscan) is believed to have been one of the twelve most important Etruscan cities—the so-called Dodecapolis, part of the Etruscan League. Etruscan remains establish that the acropolis of San Cornelio, a small hill next to that of San Donatus, was occupied and fortified in the Etruscan period. There is other significant Etruscan evidence: parts of walls, an Etruscan necropolis on Poggio del Sole (still named "Hill of the Sun"), and most famously, the two bronzes, the "Chimera of Arezzo" (5th century BC) and the "Minerva" (4th century BC) which were discovered in the 16th century and taken to Florence. Increasing trade connections with Greece also brought some elite goods to the Etruscan nobles of Arezzo: the krater painted by Euphronios c. 510 BC depicting a battle against Amazons (in the Museo Civico, Arezzo 1465) is unsurpassed.

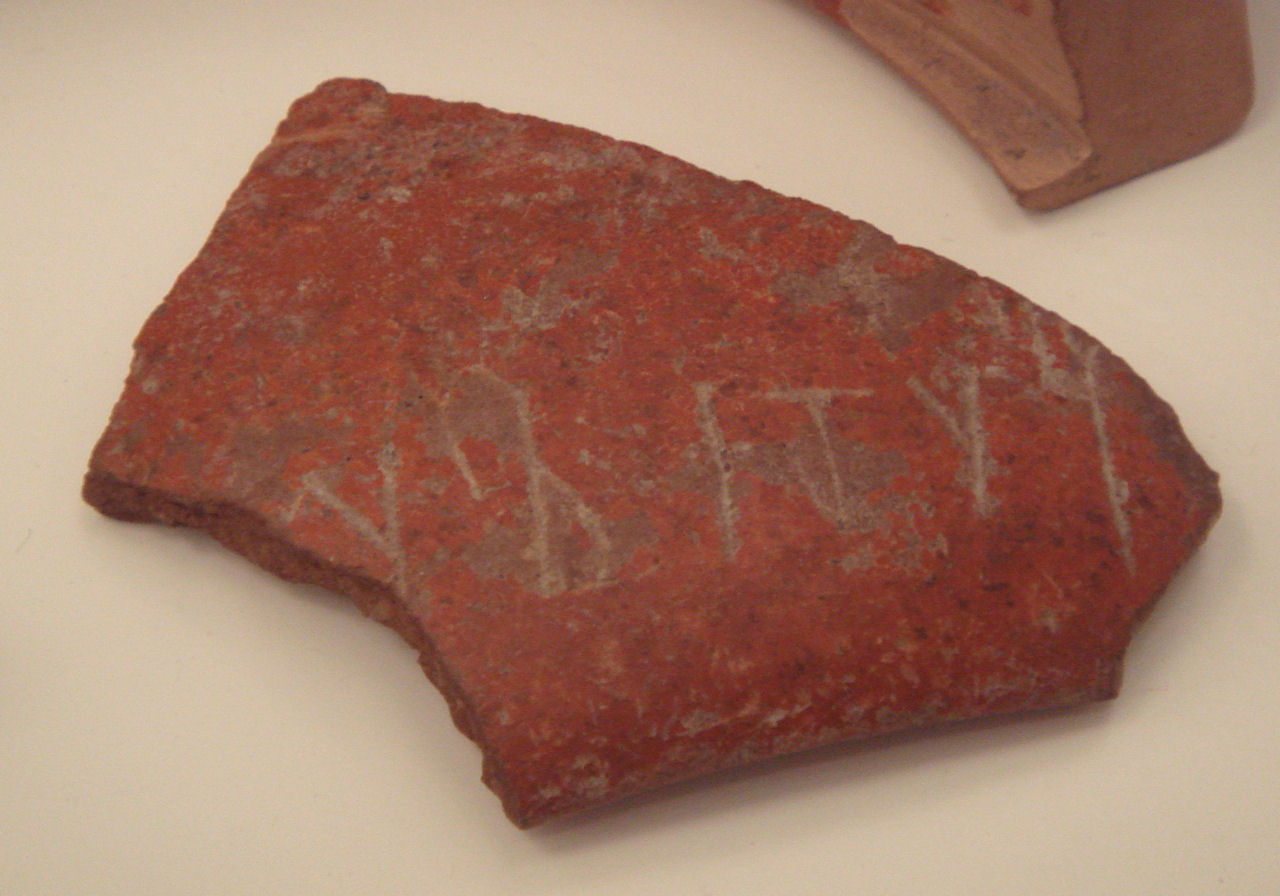
Roman pottery sherd from Arezzo, Latium, found at Arikamedu in India (1st century AD), an evidence of the role of the city in Roman trade with India through Persia during the Augustan period. Musée Guimet.

Conquered by the Romans in 311 BC, Arretium became a military station on the via Cassia, the road by which Rome expanded into the basin of the Po. Arretium sided with Marius (157 – 86 BC) in the Roman Civil War, and the victorious Sulla (c. 138 – 78 BC) planted a colony of his veterans in the half-demolished city, as Arretium Fidens ("Faithful Arretium"). The old Etruscan aristocracy was not extinguished: Gaius Cilnius Maecenas, whose name has become eponymous with "patron of the arts", came of the noble Aretine Etruscan stock. The city continued to flourish as Arretium Vetus ("Old Arretium"), the third-largest city in Italy in the Augustan period, well known in particular for its widely exported pottery manufactures, the characteristic moulded and glazed Arretine ware, bucchero-ware of dark clay and red-painted vases (the so-called "coral" vases).

Around 261 AD the town council of Arezzo dedicated an inscription to its patron L. Petronius Taurus Volusianus. See that article for discussion of the possible political/military significance of Volusianus's association with the city.

In the 3rd to 4th century Arezzo became an episcopal seat: it is one of the few cities whose succession of bishops are known by name without interruption to the present day, in part because the bishops operated as the feudal lords of the city in the Middle Ages. The Roman city was demolished, partly in the course of the Gothic War and of the late-6th-century invasion of the Lombards, partly dismantled, as elsewhere throughout Europe. The Aretines re-used the stones for fortifications. Only the amphitheater remained.

The commune of Arezzo threw off the control of its bishop in 1098 and functioned as an independent city-state until 1384. Generally Ghibelline in tendency, it opposed Guelph Florence. In 1252 the city founded its university, the Studium. After the rout of the Battle of Campaldino (1289), which saw the death of Bishop Guglielmino degli Ubertini, the fortunes of Ghibelline Arezzo started to ebb, apart from a brief period under the Tarlati family, chief among them Guido Tarlati, who became bishop in 1312 and maintained good relations with the Ghibelline party. The Tarlati sought support in an alliance with Forlì and its overlords, the Ordelaffi, but failed: Arezzo yielded to Florentine domination in 1384; its individual history became subsumed in that of Florence and of the Medicean Grand Duchy of Tuscany. During this period Piero della Francesca (c. 1415–1492) worked in the church of San Francesco di Arezzo producing the splendid frescoes, recently restored, which are Arezzo's most famous works. Afterwards the city began an economical and cultural decay, which ensured the preservation of its medieval centre.

In the 18th century the neighbouring marshes of the Val di Chiana, south of Arezzo, were drained and the region became less malarial. At the end of the-century French troops led by Napoleon Bonaparte conquered Arezzo, but the city soon turned (1799–1800) into a resistance base against the invaders with the "Viva Maria" movement, winning the city the role of provincial capital. In 1860 Arezzo became part of the Kingdom of Italy.

City buildings suffered heavy damage during World War II; the Germans made a stand in front of Arezzo early in July 1944 and fierce fighting ensued before the British 6th Armoured Division, assisted by New Zealand troops of the 2nd New Zealand Division, liberated the town 16 July 1944. The Commonwealth War Graves Commission's Arezzo War Cemetery, where 1,266 men are buried, is located to the north-west of the city.

Pope Benedict XVI visited Arezzo and two other Italian municipalities on May 13, 2012.

== Geography ==
Arezzo is set on a steep hill, rising from the floodplain of the River Arno. In the upper part of the town are the cathedral, the town hall and the Medici Fortress (Fortezza Medicea), from which the main streets branch off towards the lower part as far as the gates. The upper part of the town maintains its medieval appearance despite the addition of later structures. Arezzo's city proper is near the high risk areas for earthquakes, but located in a transitional area where the risk for severe earthquakes is much lower than in nearby Umbria and Abruzzo, albeit it is slightly more vulnerable than Florence. Notable earthquakes are still a very rare phenomenon in the province, with a 4.6 quake 25 kilometres (16 mi) to its north-east that claimed no lives on 26 November 2001 the exception.

=== Climate ===
Arezzo has a humid subtropical climate (Köppen Cfa) with hot and dry summers combined with mild and rainy winters. The annual average temperature is 13.54 °C (56.4 °F), the hottest month in August is 23.56 °C (74.4 °F), and the coldest month is 4.66 °C (40.4 °F) in January. The annual precipitation is 864.03 millimetres (34.02 in), of which November is the wettest with 120.8 millimetres (4.76 in), while July is the driest with only 42.24 millimetres (1.66 in).

Climate data for Arezzo, elevation: 248 m or 814 ft, 1991-2020 normals, extremes 1938–present
Month	Jan	Feb	Mar	Apr	May	Jun	Jul	Aug	Sep	Oct	Nov	Dec	Year
Record high °C (°F)	17.4 (63.3)	22.0 (71.6)	25.8 (78.4)	30.2 (86.4)	36.0 (96.8)	38.9 (102.0)	40.5 (104.9)	40.4 (104.7)	36.2 (97.2)	30.0 (86.0)	23.4 (74.1)	18.0 (64.4)	40.4 (104.7)
Mean daily maximum °C (°F)	9.3 (48.7)	11.0 (51.8)	14.9 (58.8)	18.8 (65.8)	23.4 (74.1)	28.0 (82.4)	31.4 (88.5)	31.7 (89.1)	25.7 (78.3)	19.9 (67.8)	13.9 (57.0)	9.8 (49.6)	19.8 (67.6)
Daily mean °C (°F)	4.7 (40.5)	5.5 (41.9)	8.8 (47.8)	12.1 (53.8)	16.6 (61.9)	20.7 (69.3)	23.6 (74.5)	23.6 (74.5)	18.5 (65.3)	14.0 (57.2)	9.2 (48.6)	5.4 (41.7)	13.5 (56.3)
Mean daily minimum °C (°F)	0.3 (32.5)	0.5 (32.9)	2.9 (37.2)	5.5 (41.9)	9.5 (49.1)	13.2 (55.8)	15.4 (59.7)	15.5 (59.9)	11.8 (53.2)	8.5 (47.3)	4.8 (40.6)	1.1 (34.0)	7.4 (45.3)
Record low °C (°F)	−20.2 (−4.4)	−20.0 (−4.0)	−10.0 (14.0)	−5.4 (22.3)	−3.1 (26.4)	0.8 (33.4)	4.8 (40.6)	5.8 (42.4)	0.5 (32.9)	−3.7 (25.3)	−8.0 (17.6)	−15.0 (5.0)	−20.2 (−4.4)
Average precipitation mm (inches)	52.8 (2.08)	57.0 (2.24)	63.5 (2.50)	71.3 (2.81)	74.5 (2.93)	52.8 (2.08)	42.2 (1.66)	43.0 (1.69)	96.0 (3.78)	108.7 (4.28)	120.8 (4.76)	81.6 (3.21)	864.0 (34.02)
Average precipitation days (≥ 1.0 mm)	6.93	6.93	7.27	8.90	8.57	6.13	3.90	3.90	6.97	8.50	10.13	8.53	86.66
Average relative humidity (%)	76.4	70.4	67.2	66.9	67.2	65.3	62.0	61.5	66.6	73.4	78.3	77.6	69.4
Average dew point °C (°F)	1.0 (33.8)	0.3 (32.5)	2.4 (36.3)	5.5 (41.9)	9.7 (49.5)	13.0 (55.4)	14.1 (57.4)	14.2 (57.6)	11.8 (53.2)	9.7 (49.5)	6.1 (43.0)	2.0 (35.6)	7.5 (45.5)
Source 1: NOAA
Source 2: Temperature estreme in Toscana

== Demographics ==
Historical population
Year	Pop.	±%
1861	37,100	—
1871	39,054	+5.3%
1881	38,795	−0.7%
1901	44,027	+13.5%
1911	48,170	+9.4%
1921	52,340	+8.7%
1931	56,886	+8.7%
1936	60,284	+6.0%
1951	66,511	+10.3%
1961	74,992	+12.8%
1971	87,330	+16.5%
1981	92,105	+5.5%
1991	91,626	−0.5%
2001	91,589	−0.0%
2011	98,144	+7.2%
2021	96,717	−1.5%
Source: ISTAT

As of 2026, the population is 96,506, of which 48.9% are males, and 51.1% are females. Minors make up 13.6% of the population, and seniors make up 27.0%.

=== Immigration ===
As of 2025, immigrants make up 15.4% of the population. The 5 largest foreign countries of birth are Romania, Bangladesh, Pakistan, Albania, and the Philippines.

Foreign-born population (2025)
Country of birth	Population
Romania	3,447
Bangladesh	2,077
Pakistan	1,610
Albania	1,380
Philippines	448
Morocco	419
China	394
Dominican Republic	362
Poland	332
Nigeria	245
India	236
Brazil	205
Ukraine	197
France	190
Sri Lanka	188

== Government ==
=== Hamlets (frazioni) ===
- Agazzi
- Antria
- Badia San Veriano
- Bagnoro
- Battifolle
- Bicciano
- Campoluci
- Campriano
- Capolona
- Ceciliano
- Chiani
- Chiassa Superiore
- Cincelli
- Frassineto
- Gaville
- Giovi
- Gragnone
- Il Matto
- Indicatore
- La Pace
- Le Poggiola
- Meliciano
- Misciano
- Molinelli
- Molin Nuovo
- Monte Sopra Rondine
- Montione
- Mugliano
- Olmo
- Ottavo
- Palazzo del Pero
- Patrignone
- Pieve a Ranco
- Poggio Ciliegio
- Policiano
- Pomaio
- Ponte a Chiani
- Ponte alla Chiassa
- Pieve a Quarto
- Ponte Buriano
- Poti
- Pratantico
- Puglia
- Policiano
- Quarata
- Rigutino
- Ripa di Olmo
- Rondine
- Ruscello
- San Firenze
- San Giuliano
- San Leo
- San Marco Vill'Alba
- San Polo
- Santa Firmina
- Santa Maria alla Rassinata
- Sant'Andrea a Pigli
- San Zeno
- Sargiano
- Sereni
- Staggiano
- Stoppe d'Arca
- Subbiano
- Talla
- Torrino
- Tregozzano
- Venere
- Vitiano

== Sights ==
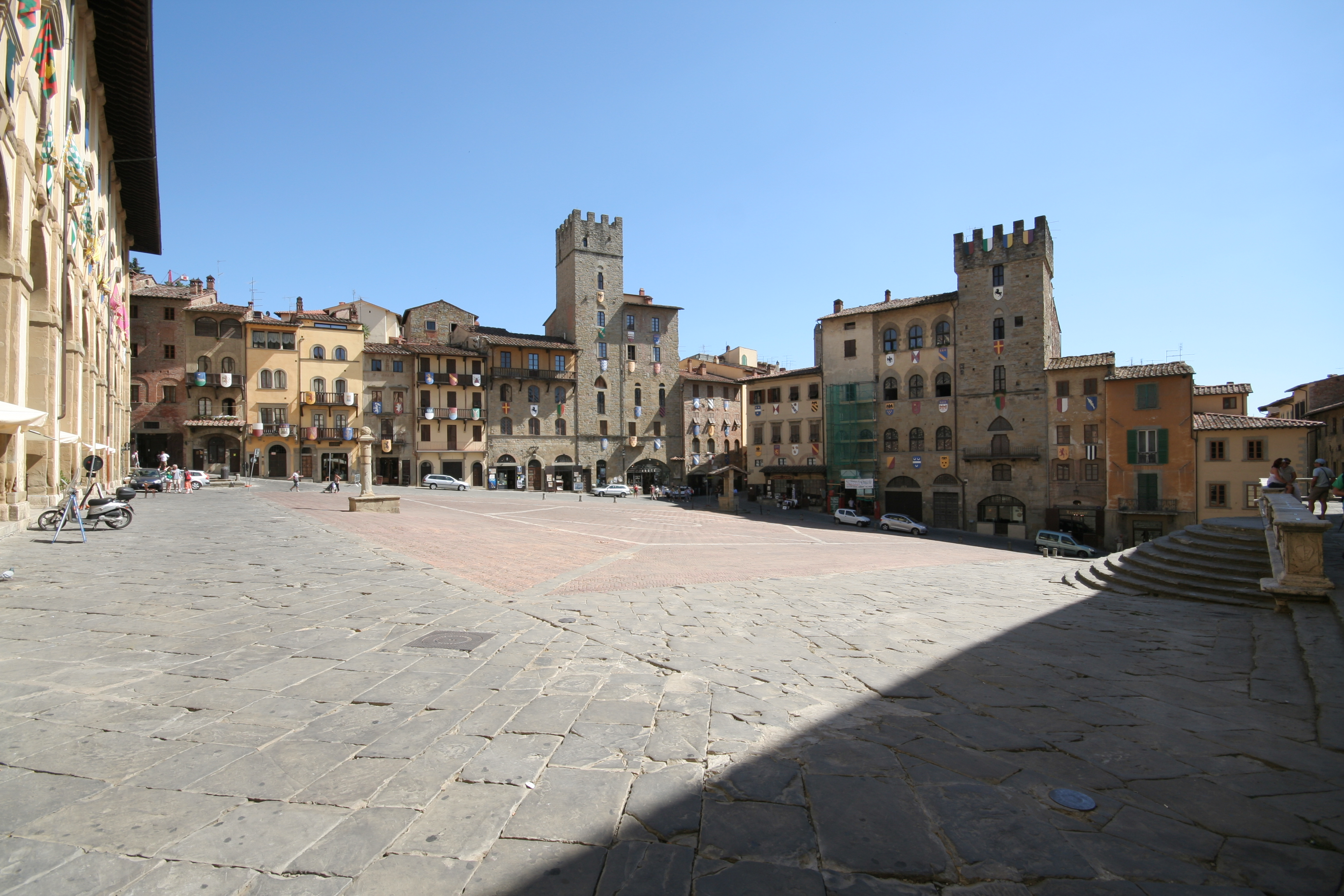
Piazza Grande

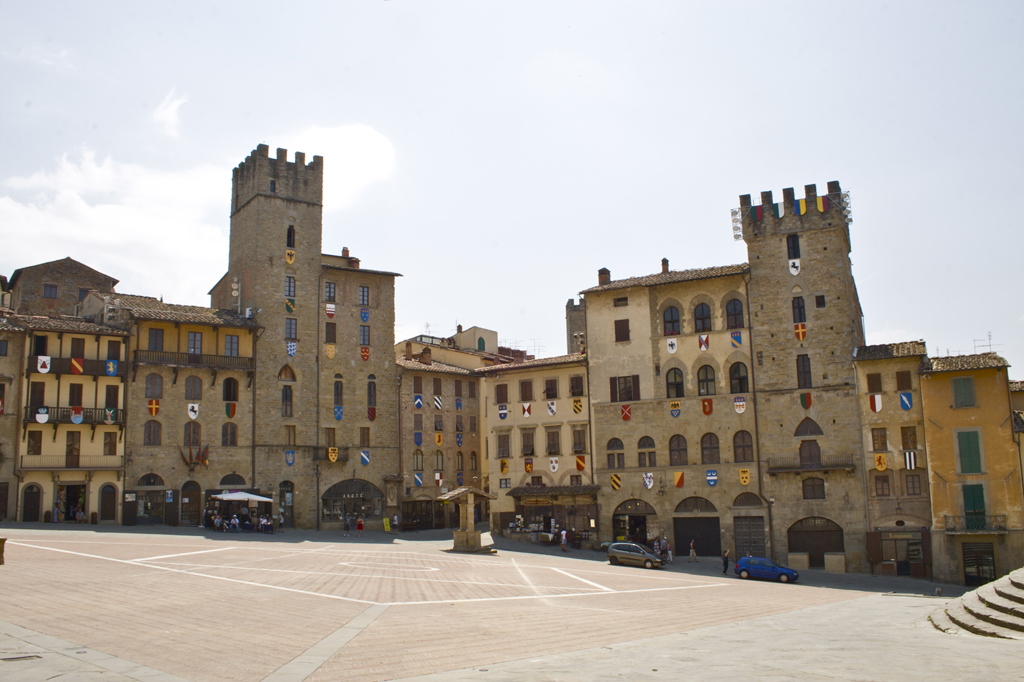
Piazza Grande

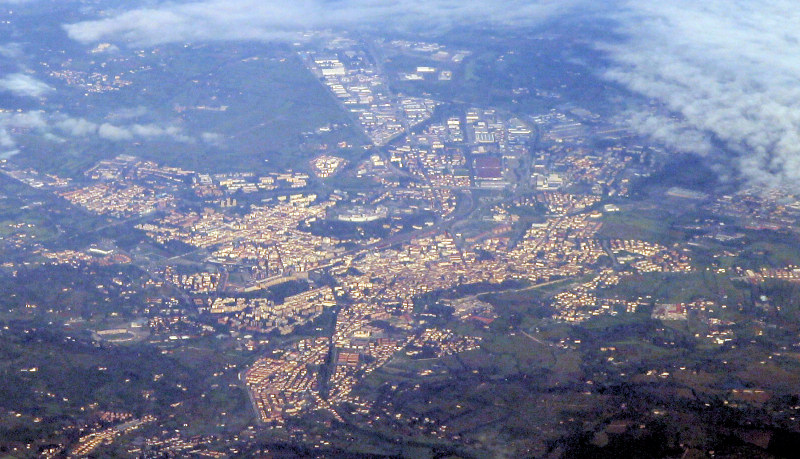
Aerial view

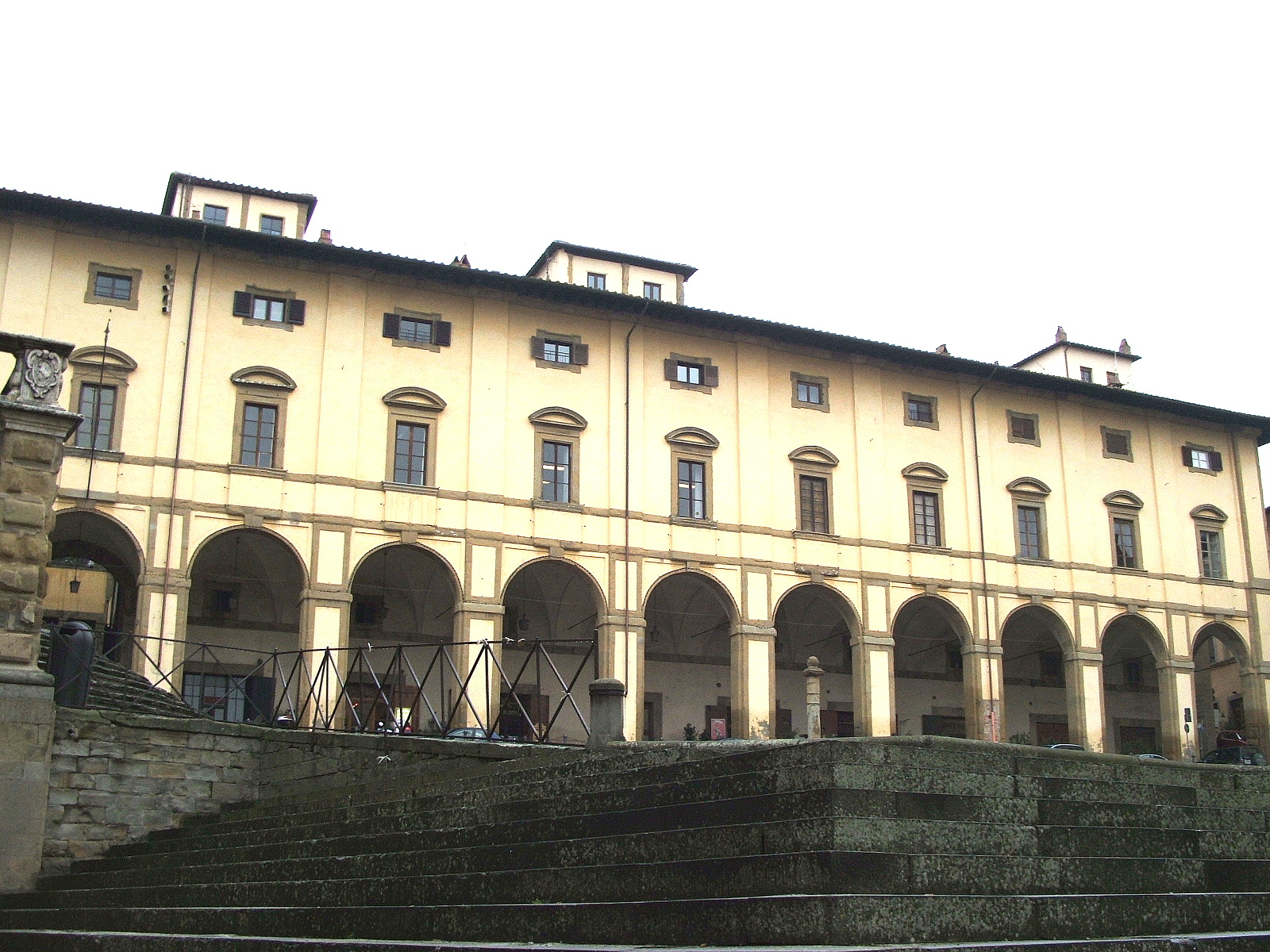
The Vasari Loggia on Piazza Grande

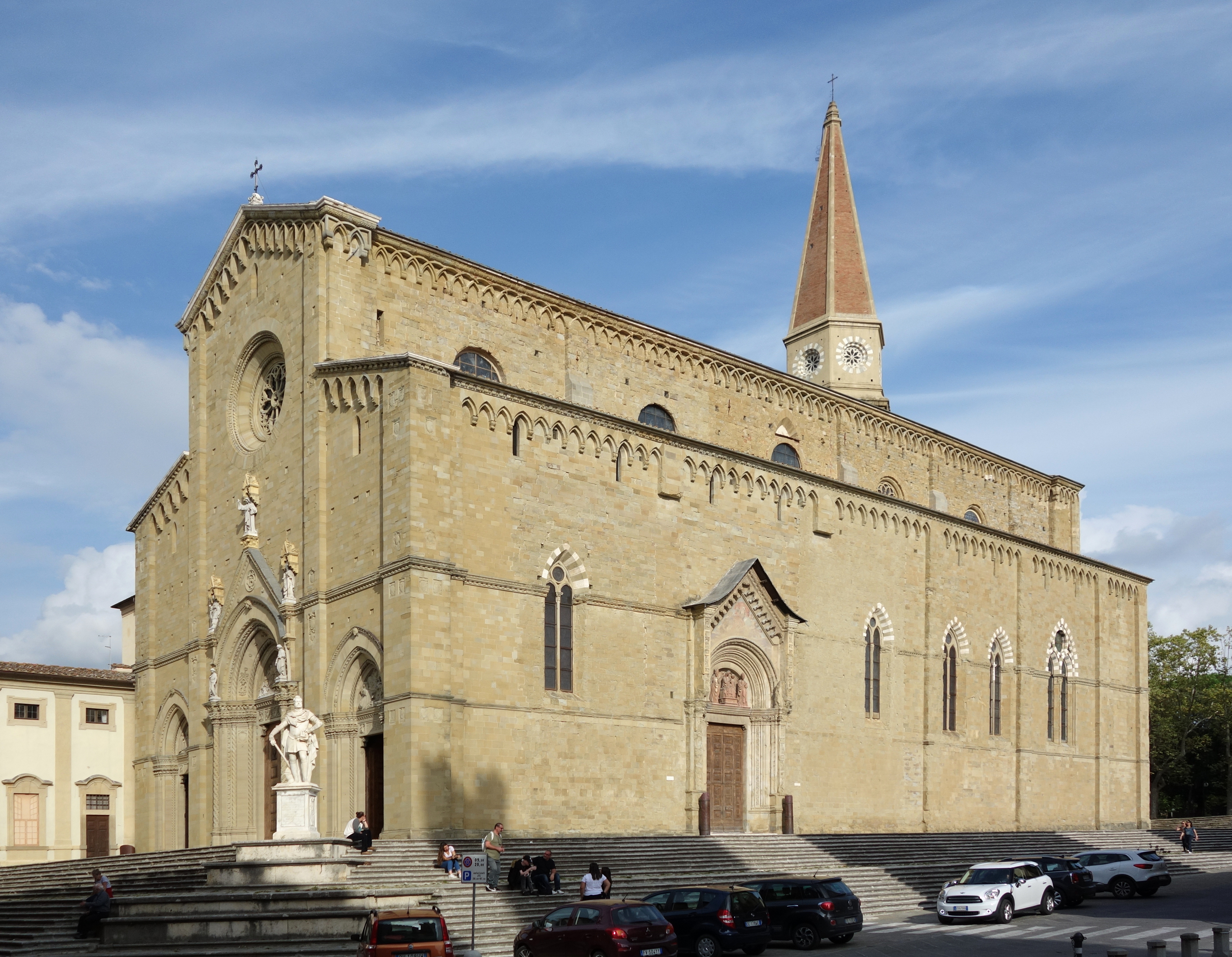
Cathedral of Arezzo

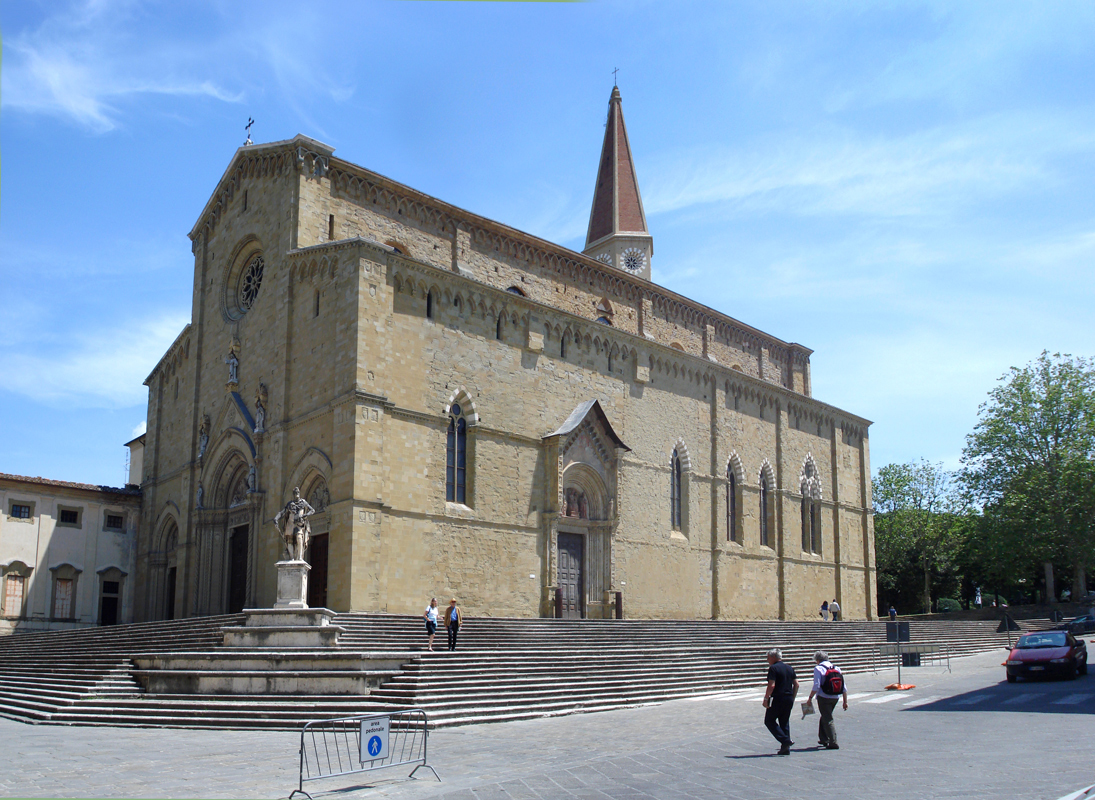
Cathedral of Arezzo

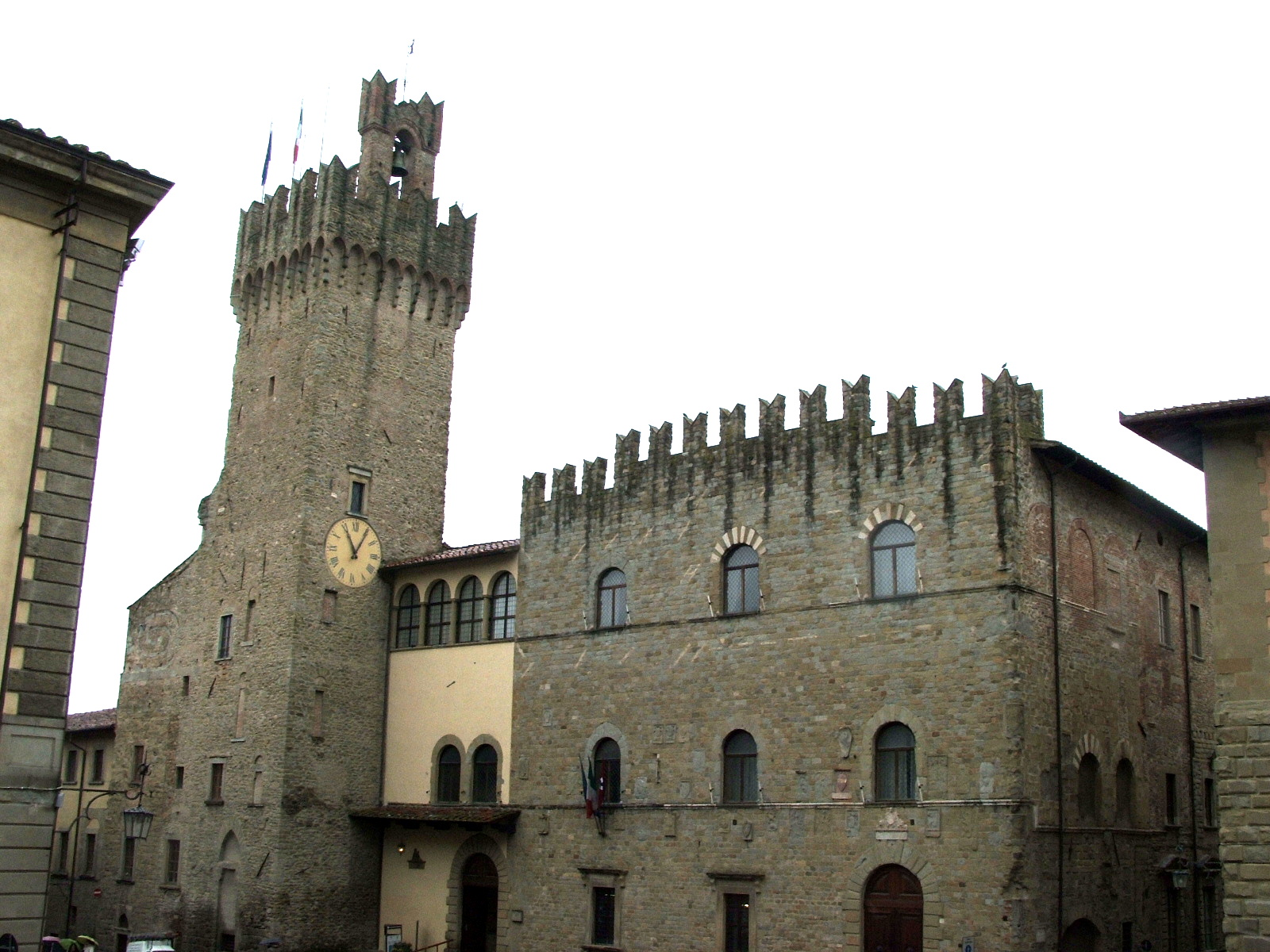
The Communal Palace in Arezzo

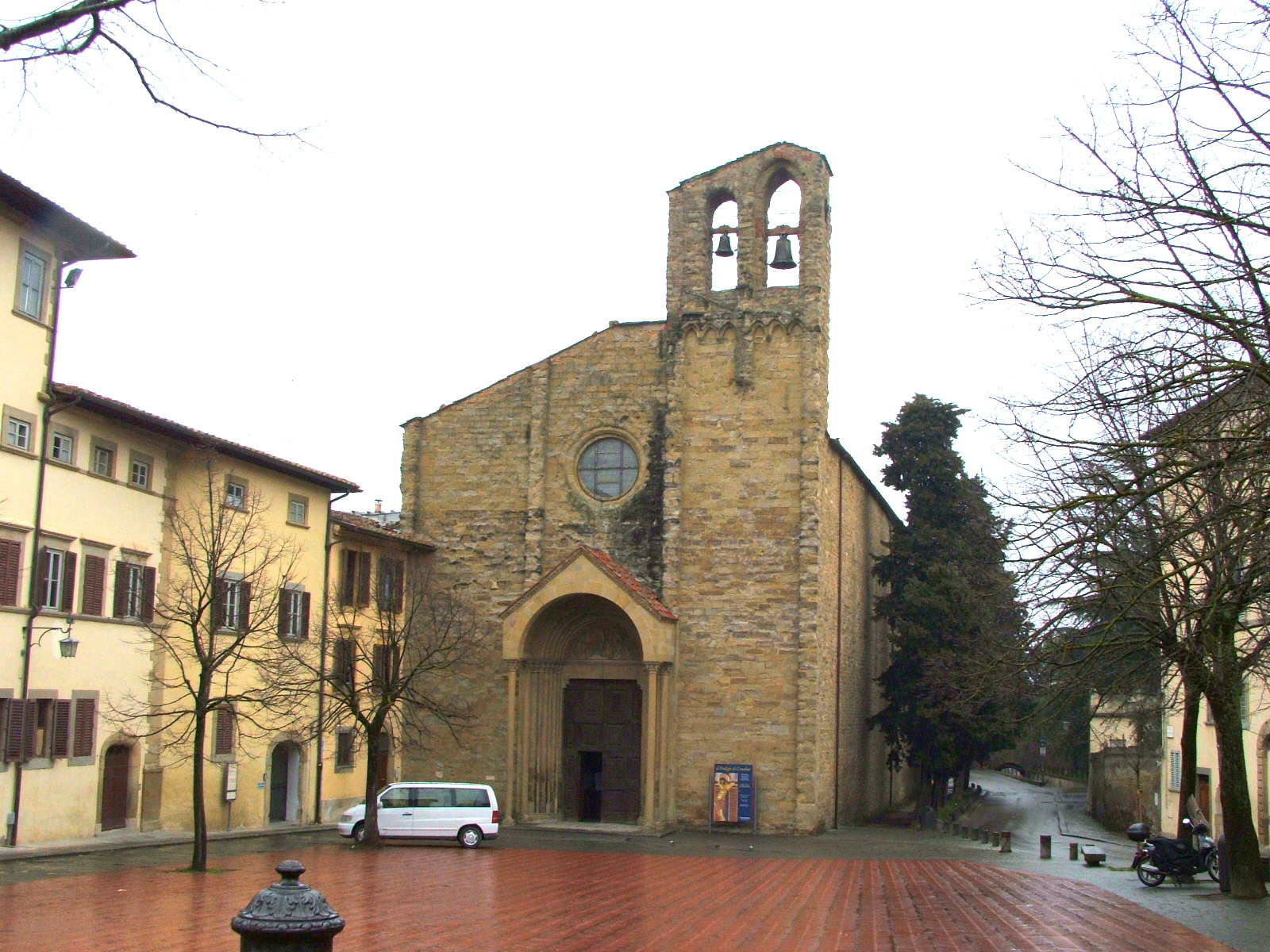
Church of San Domenico

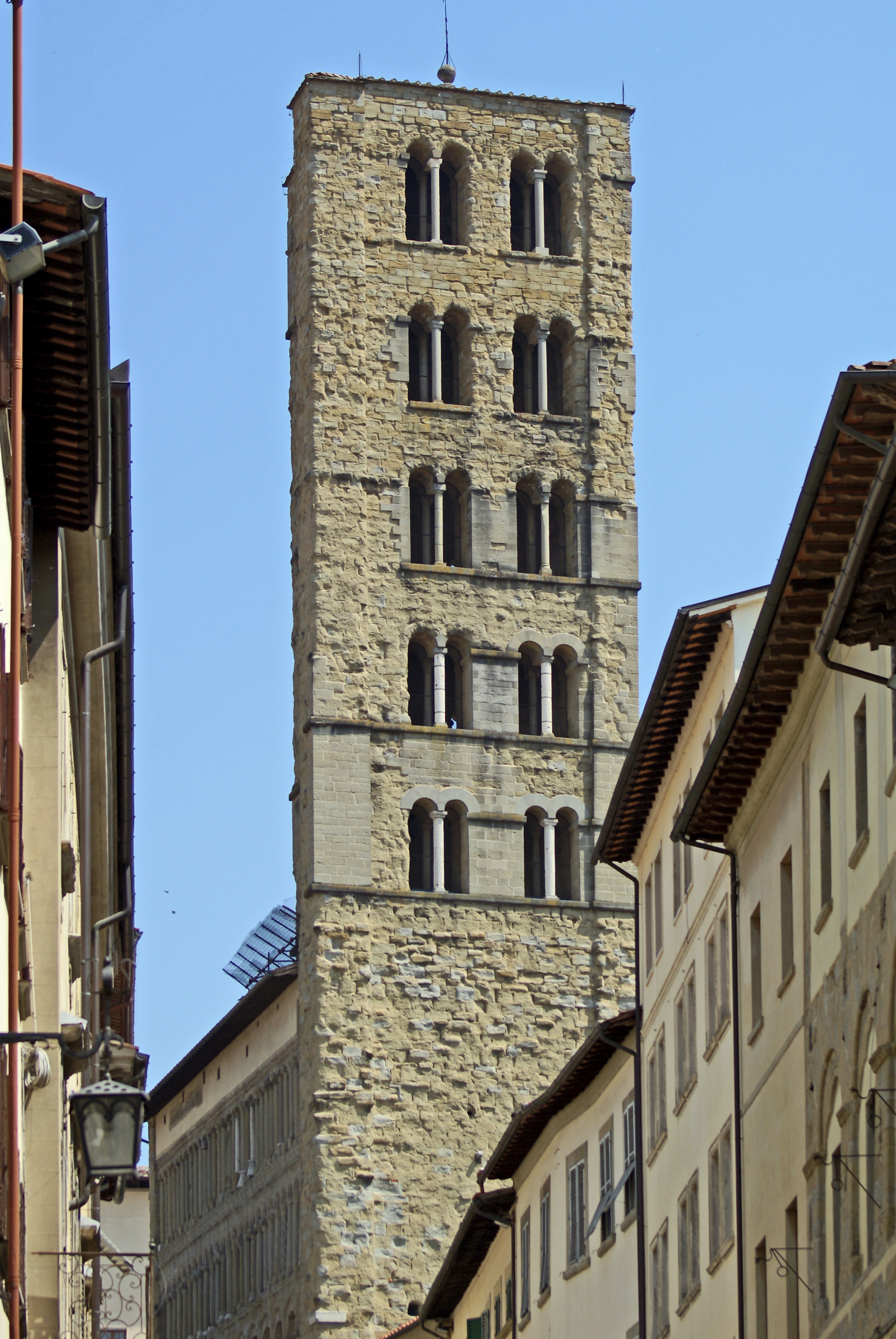
Santa Maria della Pieve

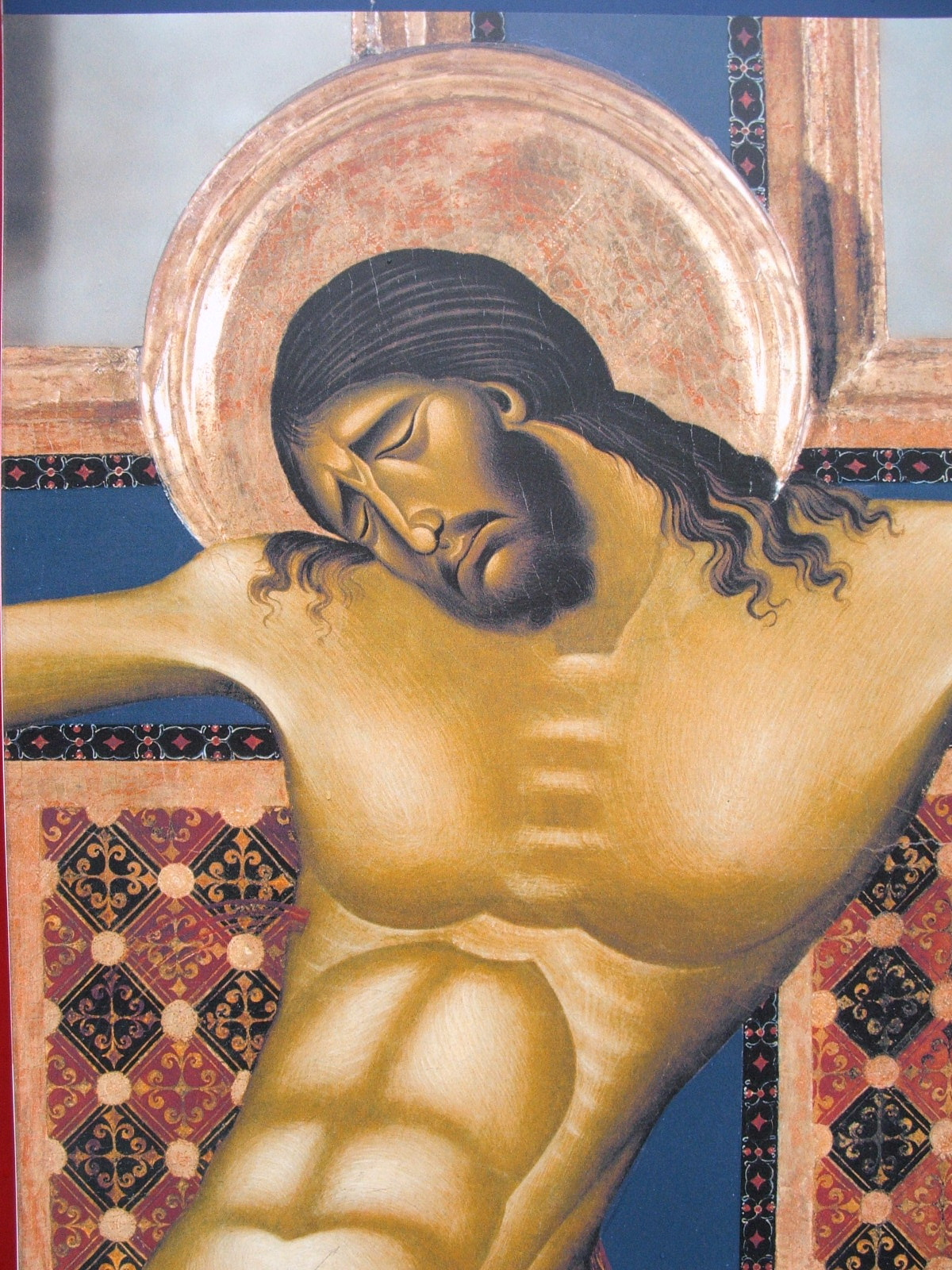
Cimabue's Crucifix in the church of San Domenico, 1265–1268

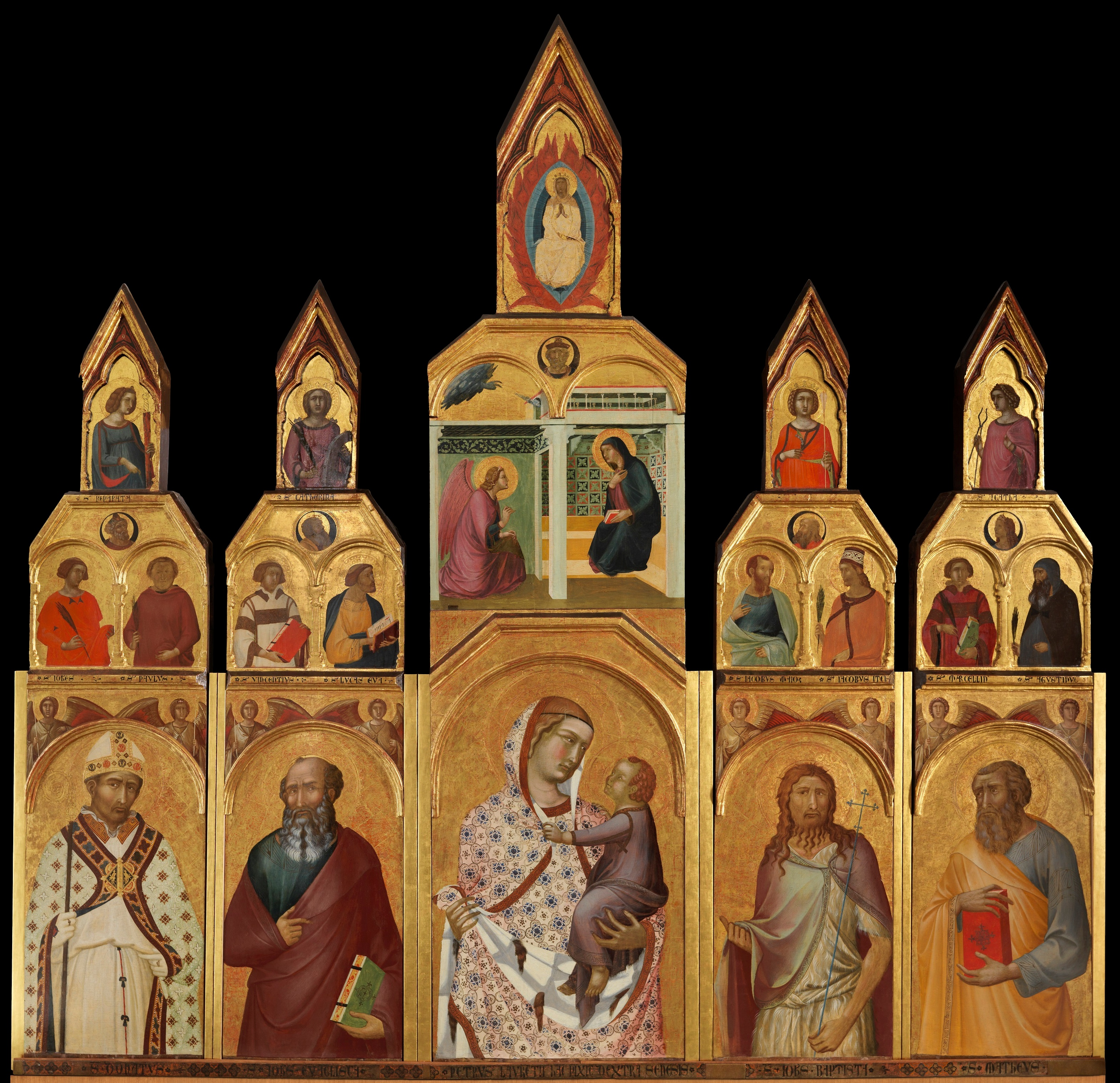
The Tarlati polyptych by Pietro Lorenzetti, 1320, at Santa Maria della Pieve; includes a depiction of Donatus of Arezzo (far left)

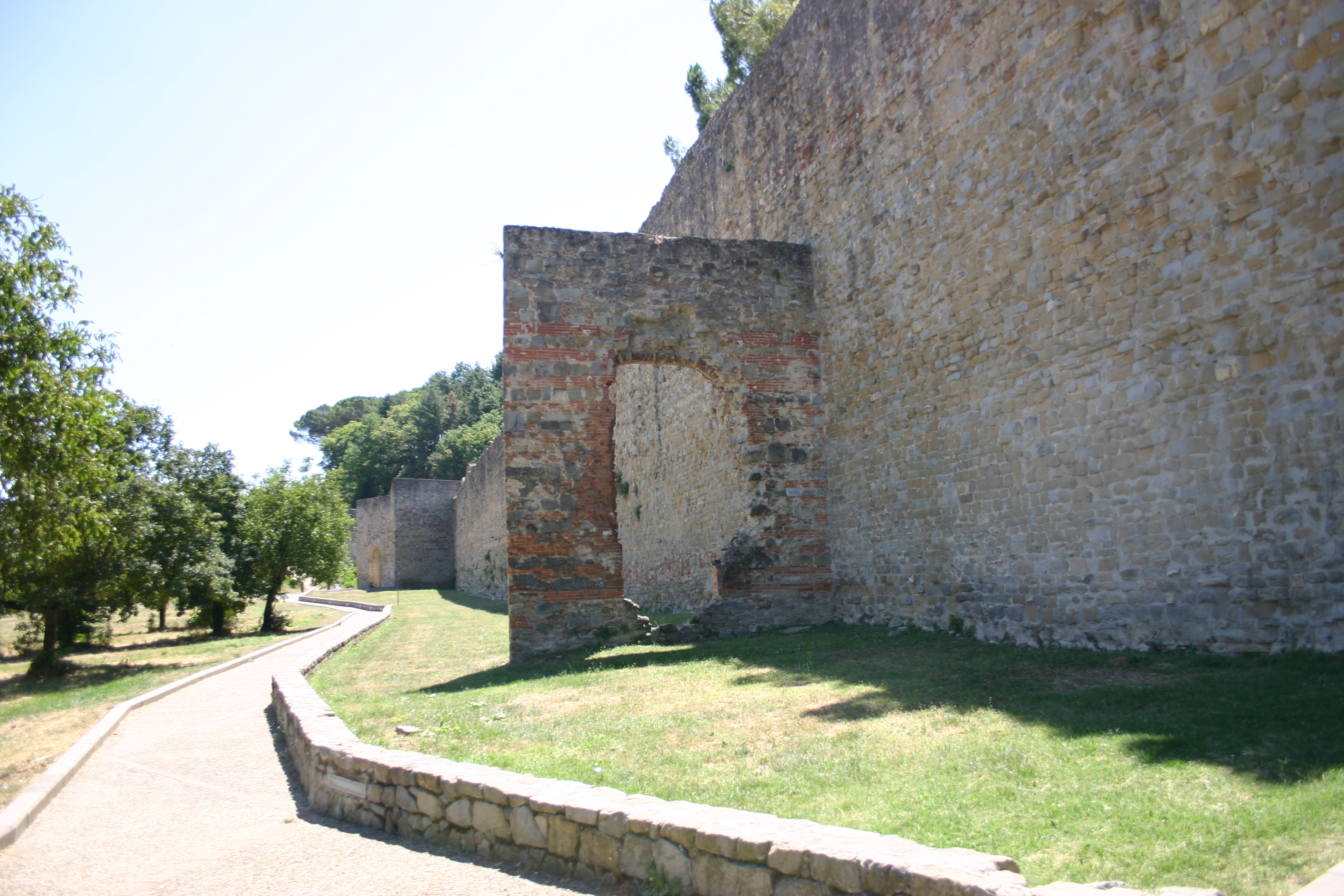
City wall

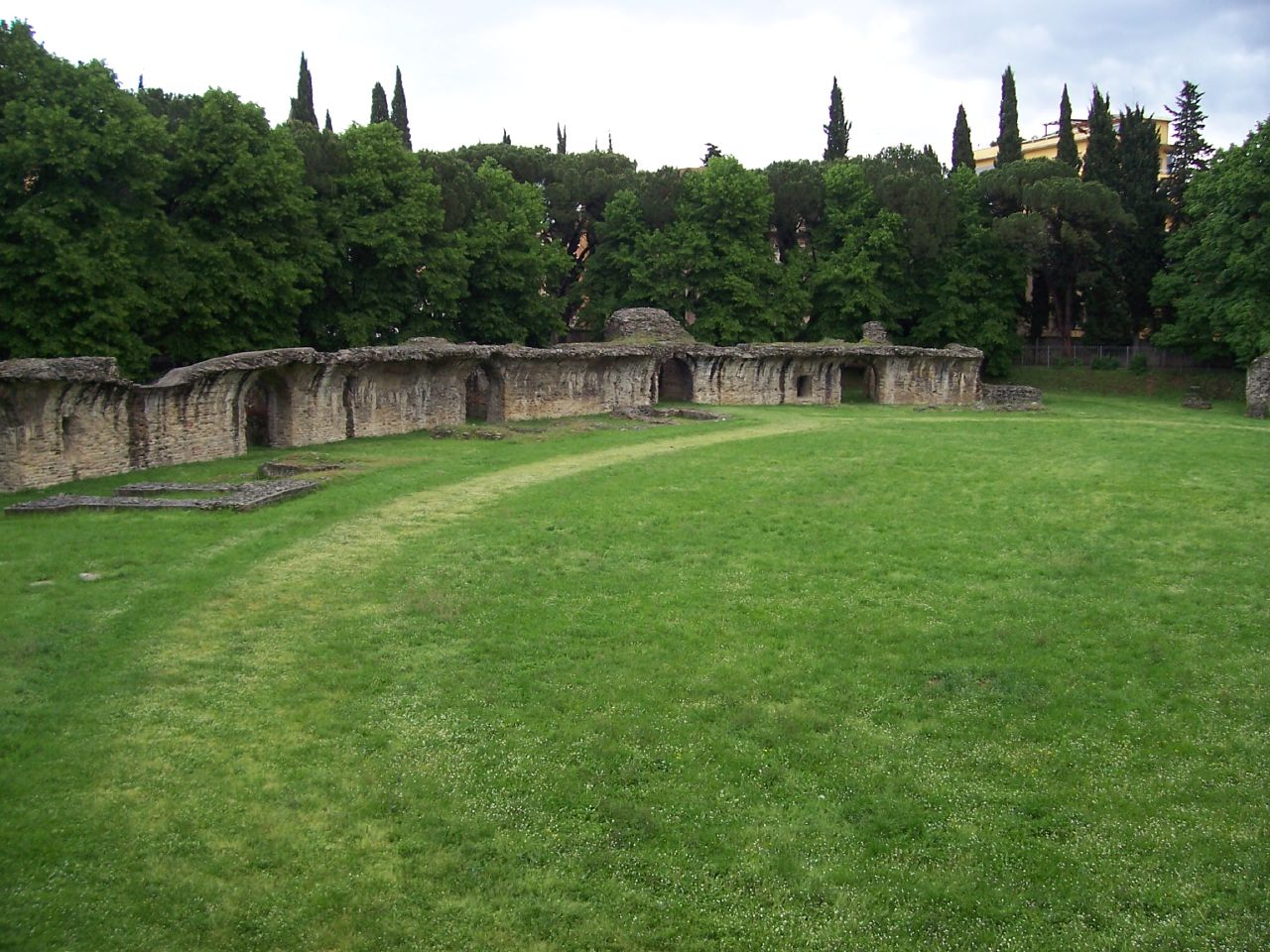
Roman amphitheatre

=== Piazza Grande ===
The Piazza Grande is the most noteworthy medieval square in the city, opening behind the 13th century Romanesque apse of Santa Maria della Pieve. Once the main marketplace of the city, it is currently the site of the Giostra del Saracino ("Joust of the Saracen"). It has a sloping pavement in red brick with limestone geometrical lines. Aside from the apse of the church, other landmarks of the square include:

- The Palace of the Lay Fraternity (Fraternita dei Laici): 14th–15th century palazzo, with a Gothic ground floor and a Quattrocento second floor by Bernardo Rossellino
- The Vasari Loggia along the north side, a flat Mannerist façade designed by Giorgio Vasari
- Episcopal Palace, seat of the bishops, rebuilt in the mid-13th century. The interior has frescoes by Salvi Castellucci, Teofilo Torri and Pietro Benvenuti. In front of the Palace is the Monument to Grand Duke Ferdinando I de' Medici (1595), by Pietro Francavilla, following a design of Giambologna.
- Palazzo Cofani-Brizzolari, with the Torre Faggiolana
- Remains of the Communal Palace and the Palazzo del Popolo can also be seen.

=== Churches ===
- Santa Maria della Pieve: the most striking feature of this Romanesque church is the massive, square-planned bell tower with double orders of mullioned windows. The church was built in the 12th century over a pre-existing Palaeo-Christian edifice, and was renovated a century later with the addition of the characteristic façade made of loggias with small arches surmounted by all different-styled columns. Also from the same century is the lunette with the Virgin between Two Angels and the sculptures of the months (1216) over the main portal. the interior has a nave and two aisles, with a transept also added in the 13th century. In the following century chapels, niches and frescoes were added, including the polyptych of Virgin with Child and Saints by Pietro Lorenzetti (1320). In the crypt is a relic bust of St. Donatus (1346). From the same epoch is the hexagonal baptismal font, with panels of the Histories of St. John the Baptist, by Giovanni di Agostino. The Pieve was again renovated by Giorgio Vasari in 1560.
- Cathedral of Saint Donatus (13th – early 16th centuries): the façade of this Gothic style church remained unfinished, and was added in the 20th century. The interior has a nave and aisles divided by massive pilasters. The left aisle has a fresco by Piero della Francesca portraying the Madeleine. Noteworthy are also the medieval stained glass, the Tarlati Chapel (1334) and the Gothic tomb of Pope Gregory X.
- Basilica of San Francesco (13th–14th centuries): built in Tuscan-Gothic style. Of the projected façade cover in sculpted stone only the lower band was completed. The interior has a single nave: the main attraction is The History of the True Cross fresco (1453–1464) cycle by Piero della Francesca in the Bacci Chapel. Under the church is another Basilica with a nave and two aisles (Basilica inferiore), today used for art exhibitions.
- Basilica of San Domenico (founded in 1275 and completed in the early 14th century): the interior has a single nave with a Crucifix by Cimabue, a masterwork of 13th-century Italian art. Other artworks include a Sts. Philip and James the Younger and St. Catherine by Spinello Aretino and other 14th-century painting and sculpture decorations.
- Santissimi Annunziata
- San Michele: this church has a modern façade. Traces of the original Romanesque edifice and the Gothic restoration can be seen in the interior.
- Santa Maria in Gradi: this medieval church was initially built in the 11th or the 12th century, but reconstructed in the late 16th century by Bartolomeo Ammannati. The interior has a single nave with stone altars (17th century) and a Madonna of Misericordia, terracotta by Andrea della Robbia.
- Church of St. Augustine: founded in 1257, modified in the late 15th and the late 18h centuries. The façade and the interior decoration are largely from Baroque times. The square plan bell tower is from the 15th century.
- Badia delle Sante Flora e Lucilla (12th century): The abbey was built by Benedictine monks in the 12th century, it was totally restored in the 16th century under the direction of Giorgio Vasari. The octagonal bell tower is from 1650. The interior, in Mannerist style, has an illusionistic canvas depicting a false dome by Andrea Pozzo (1702). There are also a St. Lawrence fresco by Bartolomeo della Gatta (1476) and a Crucifix by Segna di Buonaventura (1319).
- San Lorenzo: one of the most ancient of the city, having been built before the year 1000, most likely in Palaeo-Christian times. Rebuilt in the 13th century and restored in 1538, it was totally rebuilt in 1705. The apse exterior is in Romanesque style.
- Santa Maria delle Grazie: a late Gothic sanctuary with a Renaissance portal by Benedetto da Maiano (1490). It has also a marble high altar by Andrea della Robbia including a pre-existing fresco by Parri di Spinello (1428–1431). The sanctuary was built over a font dedicated to Apollo, which was destroyed by San Bernardino of Siena in 1428, building an oratory in its place. The church was erected in 1435–1444 and has a chapel entitled to St. Bernardino.
- Santa Maria a Gradi (1591): a monastery existing already in 1043. It has a Baroque interior, but with an altar by a collaborator of Andrea della Robbia.
- Santissima Trinità: this church was built in 1348, it was totally renovated in 1723–1748 in Baroque style. It houses a 14th-century Crucifix, a banner painted by Giorgio Vasari in 1572, a painting of Noli me tangere by Alessandro Allori (1584) and other artworks.
- Santa Maria Maddalena: built in 1561 over a pre-14th century structure. It houses a Madonna with Child (Madonna of the Rose) by Spinello Aretino, visible in the high altar (c. 1525) designed by Guillaume de Marcillat. It is now private property.
- Pieve di San Paolo: erected as Palaeo-Christian baptismal church, rebuilt in the 8th-9th centuries and then rebuilt in Romanesque style in the 13th century. The bell tower is from the 14th-15th centuries. The entire church was again renovated after the 1796 earthquake. It has kept 15th-century frescoes by Lorentino d'Andrea and a cyborium. The transept entrance has granite columns with marble capitals from the 5th century AD.
- Pieve di Sant'Eugenia al Bagnoro: documented from 1012, it was one of the most important pievi of the diocese during the Middle Ages. The presbytery area is from the 12th century, while the rest is from the 11th century. The bell tower, partially ruined, stands on one of the three apses.
- Pieve di San Donnino a Maiano, at Palazzo del Pero (6th–9th centuries): documented from 1064, it replaced a Palaeo-Christian baptismal church. The frontal part was rebuilt in the 14th century. The apse has 15th-century frescoes and a wooden Madonna with Child from the same age.

=== Others ===
- Roman amphitheatre and museum
- Palazzo dei Priori: erected in 1333, has been the seat of the city's magistratures until today. The edifice was numerous times restored and renovated; the interior has a court from the 16th century, a stone statue portraying a Madonna with Child (1339), frescoes, busts of illustrious Aretines, two paintings by Giorgio Vasari. The square tower is from 1337.
- Medici Fortress (Fortezza Medicea): designed by Antonio da Sangallo the Younger and completed in 1538–1560. It was partly dismantled by the French in the early 19th century.
- Palazzo Camaiani-Albergotti (14th century, renovated in the 16th century), with the Torre della Bigazza
- Palazzo Bruni-Ciocchi: Renaissance edifice attributed to Bernardo Rossellino. It is seat of the State Museum of Medieval and Modern Art.
- Palazzo Pretorio: which was seat of the People's Captain until 1290. The façade has coat of armas of the captains, podestà and commissaries of the city from 14th to 18th century. Only one of the two original towers remains.
- House of Petrarch (Casa del Petrarca)
- Casa Vasari (in Via XX Settembre): an older house rebuilt in 1547 by Giorgio Vasari and frescoed by him; now open as a museum, it also contains 16th-century archives. The main rooms were decorated by Vasari in an illusionist manner. The drawing room, where Vasare painted the life journey of an artist, with the artistic virtues protected by the gods of antiquity represented as heavenly bodies, is remarkable.
- Ivan Bruschi House and Museum (Casa-Museo Ivan Bruschi)
- Gaio Cilnio Mecenate Archeological Museum
- Civic Museum of Modern and Contemporary Art
- UnoAErre Jewelry Museum

== Culture ==
=== Festivals ===
Arezzo is home to an annual medieval festival called the Saracen Joust (Giostra del Saracino). In this, "knights" on horseback representing different areas of the town charge at a wooden target attached to a carving of a Saracen king and score points according to accuracy. Virtually all the town's people dress up in medieval costume and enthusiastically cheer on the competitors.

Arezzo hosts an annual popular music and culture festival each July, called Arezzo Wave. Publicly funded, it attracts bands of high repute and attendees from all over Europe and North America and features some literary and film expositions.

Arezzo also hosts an annual international competition of choral singing Concorso Polifónico Guido d'Arezzo (International Guido d'Arezzo Polyphonic Contest).

=== In popular culture ===
Arezzo has a starring role in Roberto Benigni's film Life Is Beautiful (La vita è bella, 1997), which won three Academy Awards (Best Foreign Film, Best Actor, Best Original Score). It is the place in which the main characters live before they are shipped off to a Nazi concentration camp.

Arretium was used in the PC game Rome: Total War as the Capital of the Roman Faction of Julii.

== Transport ==
Arezzo has a railway station with regional and long distance service towards Rome and Florence.

There is no airport in the city. The nearest airports are:

- Perugia San Francesco d'Assisi – Umbria International Airport, located 90 km (56 mi) north east.
- Florence Airport, located 90 km (56 mi) north west.
- Pisa International Airport, located 156 km (97 mi) north east.

== Sport ==
- Associazione Calcio Arezzo (A.C. Arezzo)
- Vasari Rugby Arezzo
- Club sommozzatori Calypso – Federazione Italiana Attività Subacquee – Sez. Terr. Arezzo (diving)

== Notable people ==
- Guido d'Arezzo (c. 991–992 – after 1033), music theorist of the Middle Ages, inventor of modern music notation. He lived in Arezzo for many years, and was possibly born there.
- Margaritone d'Arezzo (c. 1250 – 1290), 13th-century painter
- Giovanni Filippo Apolloni (1620–1688), 17th-century poet and librettist
- Pietro Aretino (1492–1556), author, playwright, poet and satirist, inventor of modern literary pornography
- Roberto Benigni (born 1952), actor and director
- Daniele Bennati (born 1980), cyclist
- Fabio Bidini (born 1968), pianist
- Poggio Bracciolini (1380–1459), artist, born near the town
- Mario Cassi (born 1973), baritone
- Andrea Cesalpino (1524–1603), physician, botanist and philosopher
- Luc Ferrari (1929–2005), avant-garde composer
- Piero della Francesca (1412–1492), painter. He spent most of his life in the city of Arezzo.
- Bartolomeo di ser Gorello (1322/26 – c. 1390), author of the first town chronicle of Arezzo
- Vittorio Grigolo (born 1977), tenor
- Federico Luzzi (1980–2008), professional tennis player
- Michelangelo (1475–1564), artist, born near the town
- Negrita, rock band
- Petrarch (1304–1374), poet
- Francesco Redi (1626–1697), 17th-century physician
- Dylan and Cole Sprouse (born 1992), American actors
- Giorgio Vasari (1511–1574), painter, architect and biographer

== International relations ==
=== Twin towns – sister cities ===
Arezzo is twinned with:

- Viseu, Portugal
- Montenars, Italy, since 1977
- Jaén, Spain, since 2006
- Norman, Oklahoma, United States, since 2009
- Oświęcim, Poland, since May–June 2009
- Mount Pleasant, Michigan, United States, since 27 November 2010

== See also ==
- Gian Francesco Gamurrini – an early Etruscologist
- Lago di Montedoglio
- Monument to Grand Duke Ferdinand III of Lorraine, Arezzo
