= Patrignone =

Patrignone may refer to:

- Patrignone, Arezzo, a village in the province of Arezzo, Italy
- Patrignone, Montalto delle Marche, a village in the province of Ascoli Piceno, Italy
- Patrignone, San Giuliano Terme, a village in the province of Pisa, Italy
