= Bartolomeo di ser Gorello =

Italian chronicler

Bartolomeo di ser Gorello (1322/26 – c. 1390), also known by the Latinized name Bartholomeus Gorellus, was an Italian notary who wrote a town chronicle of Arezzo in Italian verse. The Cronica dei fatti d'Arezzo is important to historians for its Ghibelline perspective on the power base of North Italian city-states in the later 14th century.

== Edition ==
Arturo Bini and Giovanni Grazzini, Cronica dei fatti d'Arezzo, Rerum Italicarum Scriptores (Raccolta degli Storici Italiani) 2, 15/1, N. Zanichelli, 1917.
