= Saracen Joust =

Italian jousting tournament

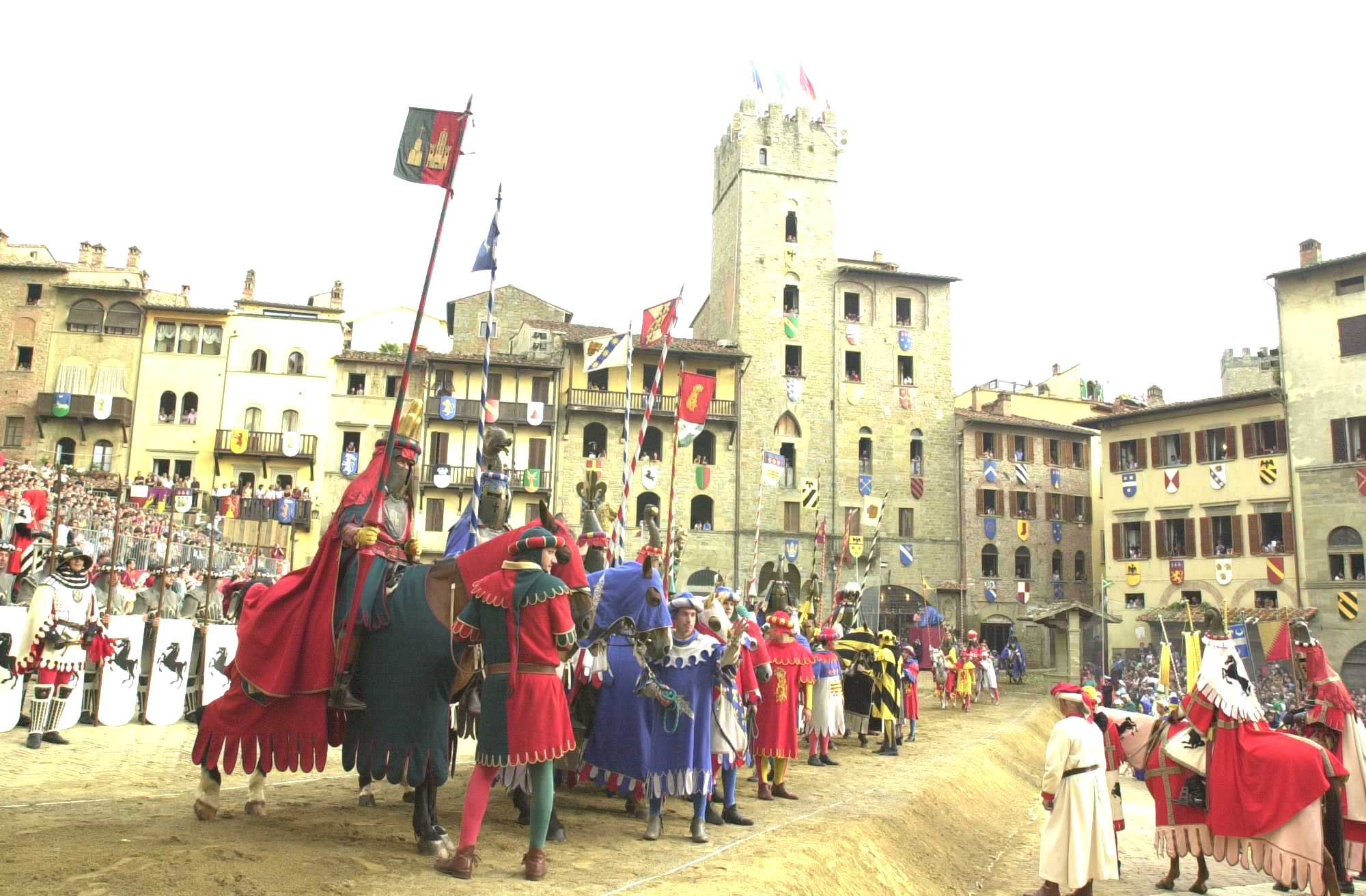
Saracen joust of Arezzo

The Saracen joust of Arezzo (Giostra del Saracino, Giostra ad burattum) is a jousting tournament first held in 1260 CE.

== History ==
The joust began as a military training exercise. The tournament was regularly held in Arezzo between the 16th century and the end of the 17th century, when baroque-style jousts were popular. The match continued through the Modern Age, serving an important social function of commemorating visits of important authorities (sovereigns, princes, etc.), and celebrating certain civil feasts (e.g. carnivals and noble's weddings).

The joust declined progressively during the 18th century and the noble version of the event eventually disappeared. After a brief popular revival, the joust ended in 1810 before reappearing in 1904 in the wake of the Middle Ages reappraisal brought on by Romanticism. The joust was reinstated in 1931 as a form of historical re-enactment set in the 14th century, but quickly reacquired a competitive character.

== Events ==
The San Donato Joust takes place every year in Arezzo on the next to last Saturday of June, at night (dedicated to the city's patron saint) while the September Joust transpires on the first Sunday afternoon of September. The participating teams represent the city's four quarters:

- Porta Crucifera, known as Culcitrone (green and red),
- Porta del Foro, known as Porta San Lorentino (yellow and crimson),
- Porta Sant'Andrea (white and green)
- Porta del Borgo, today called Porta Santo Spirito (yellow and blue).

The Saracen Joust is organized by the Municipality of Arezzo through a managing council chaired by the Mayor of Arezzo, and also includes the presidents (Rettori) of the four competing quarters.

The jousting day starts in the morning, when the town's Herald reads the challenge proclamation, and continues with a procession of 350 costumed characters and 27 horses parading in the streets. The parade climaxes with the blessing of the men-at-arms, which takes place on the steps of the Duomo and is administered by the Bishop of Arezzo.

The joust is held in the Piazza Grande. The costumed characters and the city's ancient banners enter the square accompanied by the sound of trumpets and drums, guided by the Maestro di Campo. The highest authorities of the joust then enter the square (the magistrates, the Jury, the quarters' presidents) followed by a flag-waving performance. The jousters then gallop into the field, each knight contestant representing an ancient noble family of Arezzo. The knights' arrange themselves on the lizza (jousting track); the Herald reads the Challenge of Buratto (a poetic composition written in octaves in the 17th century), the crossbowmen and the soldiers greet the crowd shouting "Arezzo!", the magistrates' authorize the joust and finally musicians play the Saracen Hymn, composed by Giuseppe Pietri (1886–1946).

The jousters of the four gates gallop their horses with lance in rest against the "Buratto, King of the Indies", a spring-loaded automaton holding a flail and a shield. The sequence of jousters is drawn in the week preceding the joust during a ceremony in Piazza del Comune. The result of the joust depends on the ability, courage, and luck of the eight jousters who alternate on the packed-earth sloping track (the lizza) that runs across Piazza Grande. The competition is won by the pair of knights obtaining the highest score. The quarter associated to the winning knight receives the coveted golden lance. In the event of a draw between two or more quarters after the standard number of charges (two sets of charges for each jouster), the prize is assigned by one or more charges. At the end of the joust, mortar shots hail the winning quarter.

The rules of the tournament are contained in technical regulations that repeat – virtually unchanged – the Chapters for the Buratto Joust dating back to 1677. Jousters may be disqualified if they ride off the jousting track, while their scores may be doubled if their lance breaks after hitting the buratto.

== Videogame ==
On 15 June 2010, a free videogame about the Saracen Joust was released in collaboration with Arezzo municipality and the Saracen Joust Institution. It was developed with Unity technology and accessible directly via a standard web browser. The game allows the player to participate as a jouster of one of the four-quarters. The game includes the Herald's announcements. Up to four players in multiplayer mode can participate online and rank in the global rankings.

== See also ==
- Arezzo
- Jousting

== Gallery ==
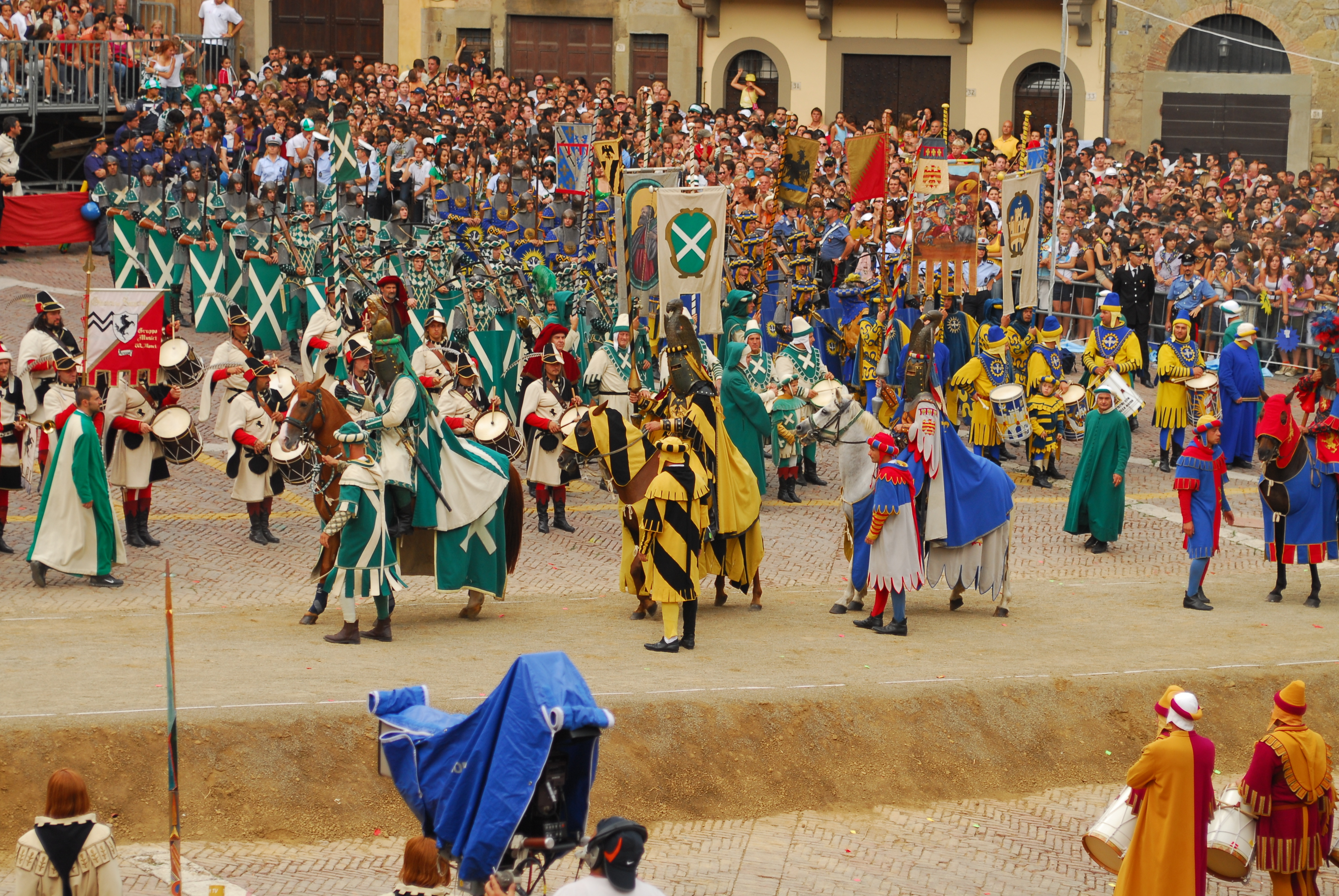

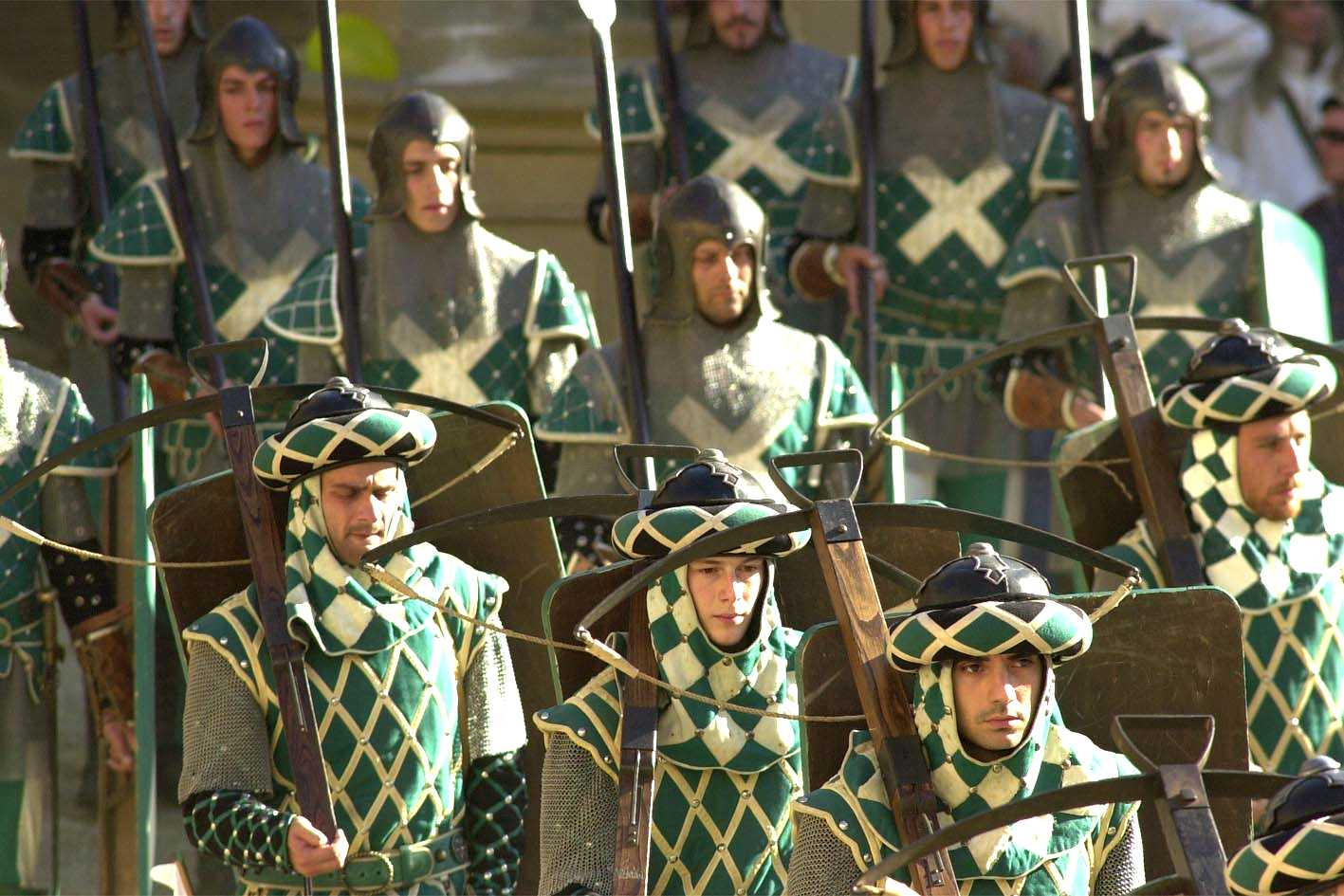

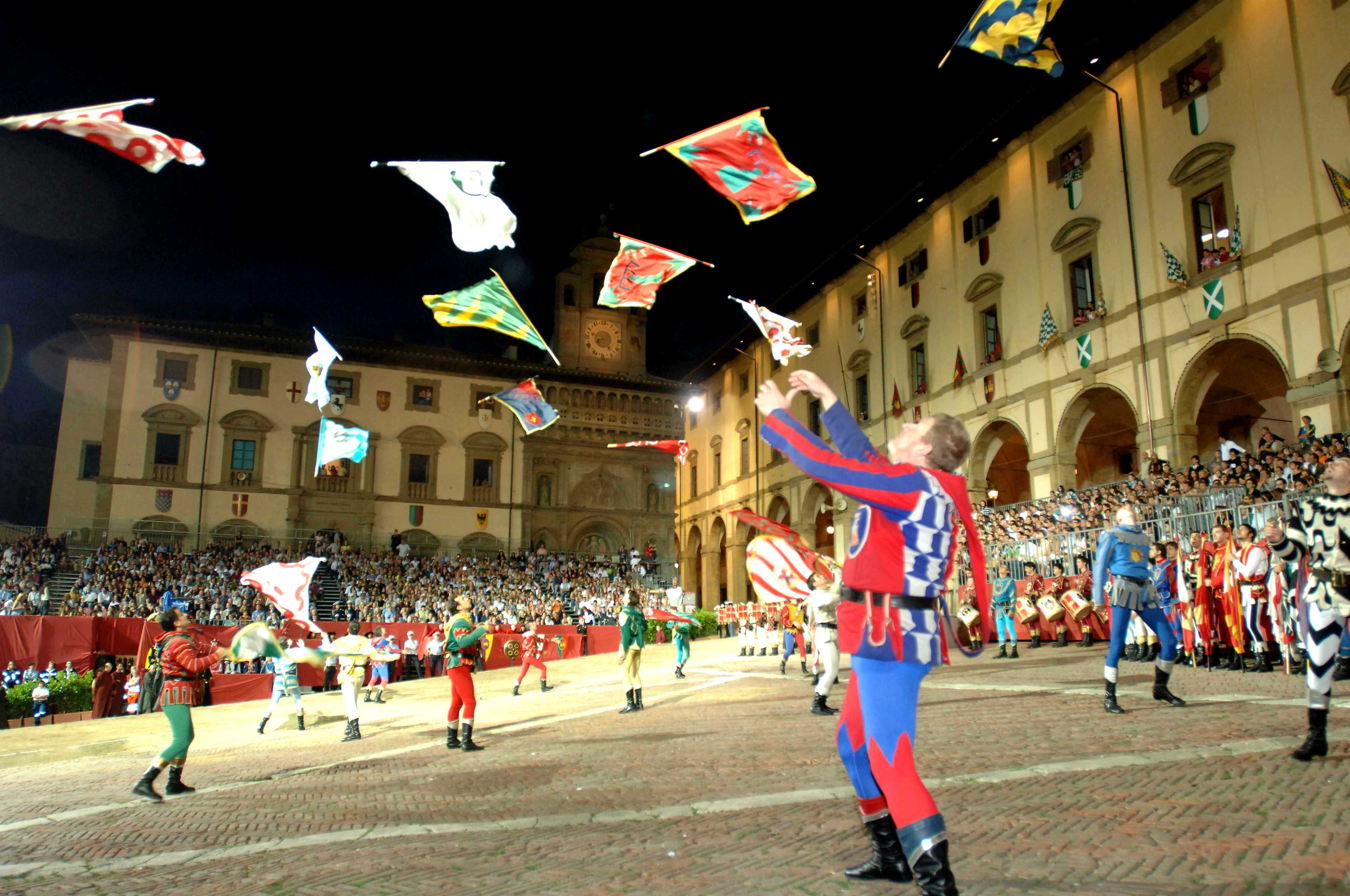

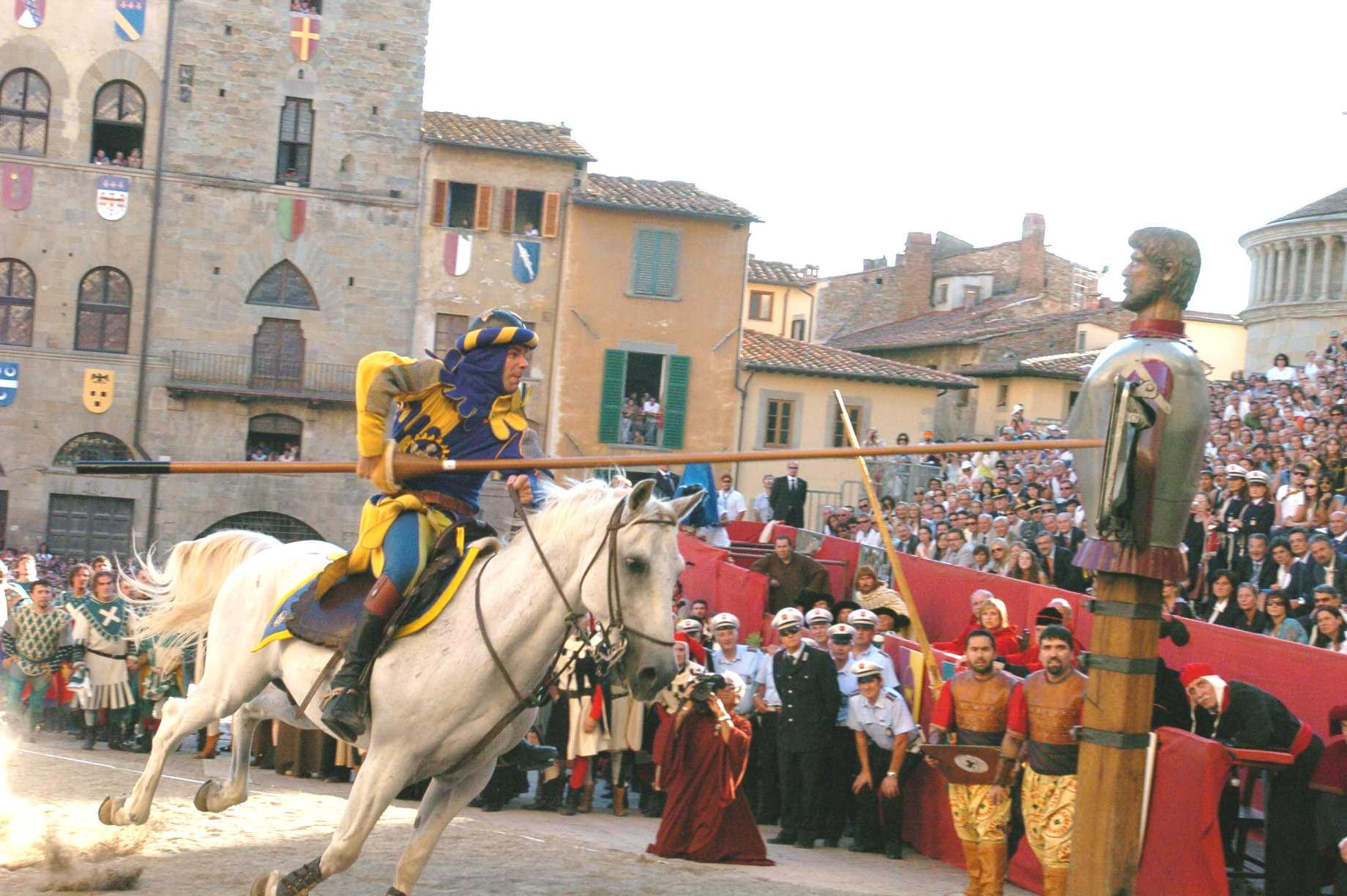

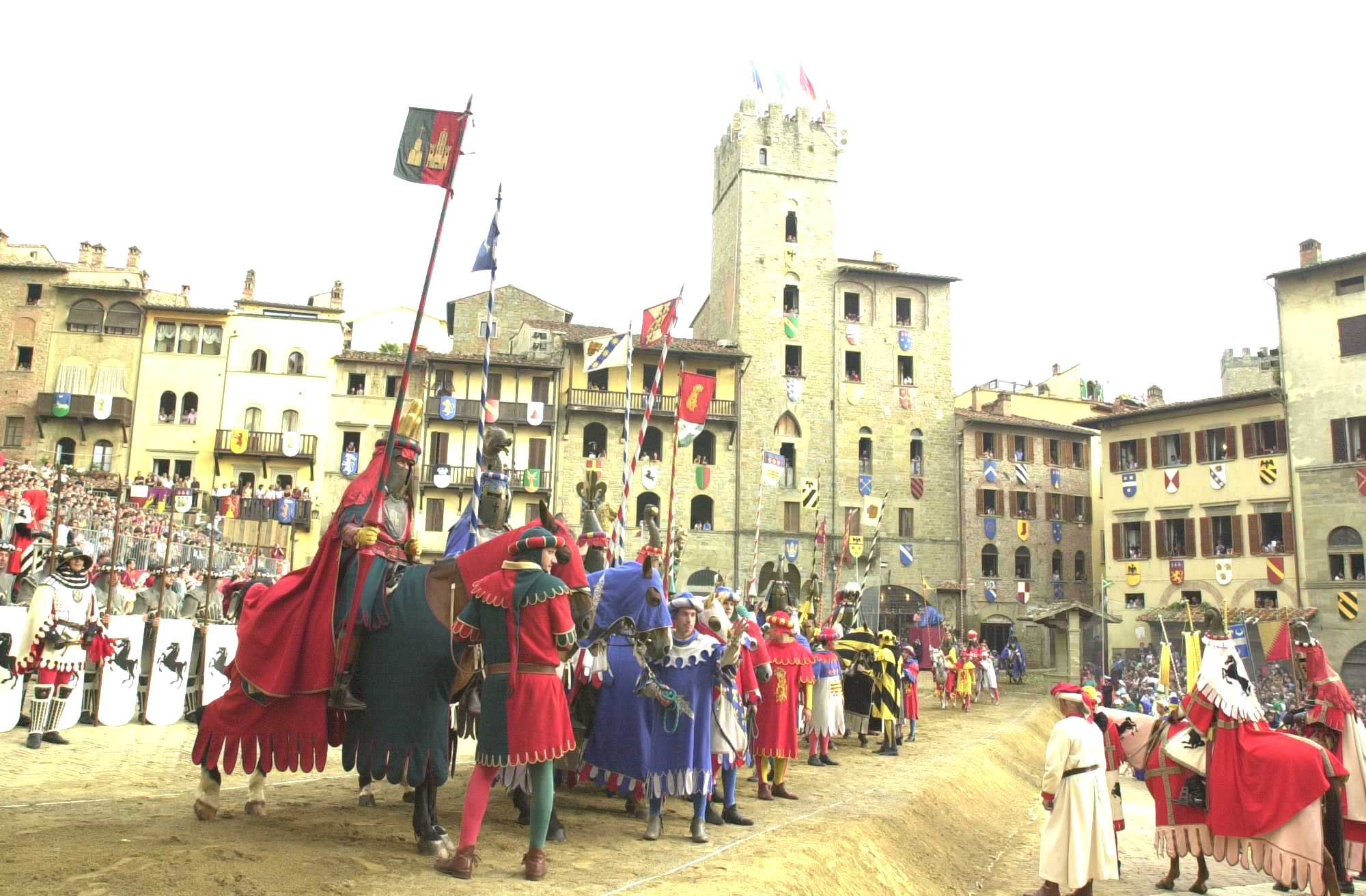

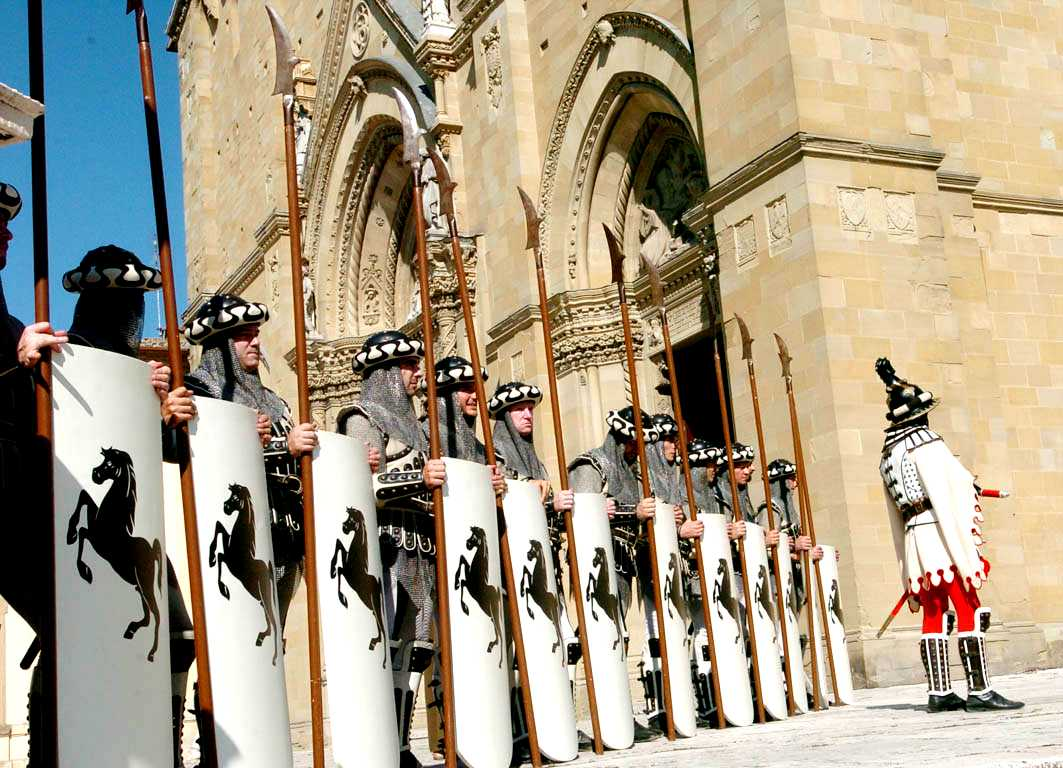

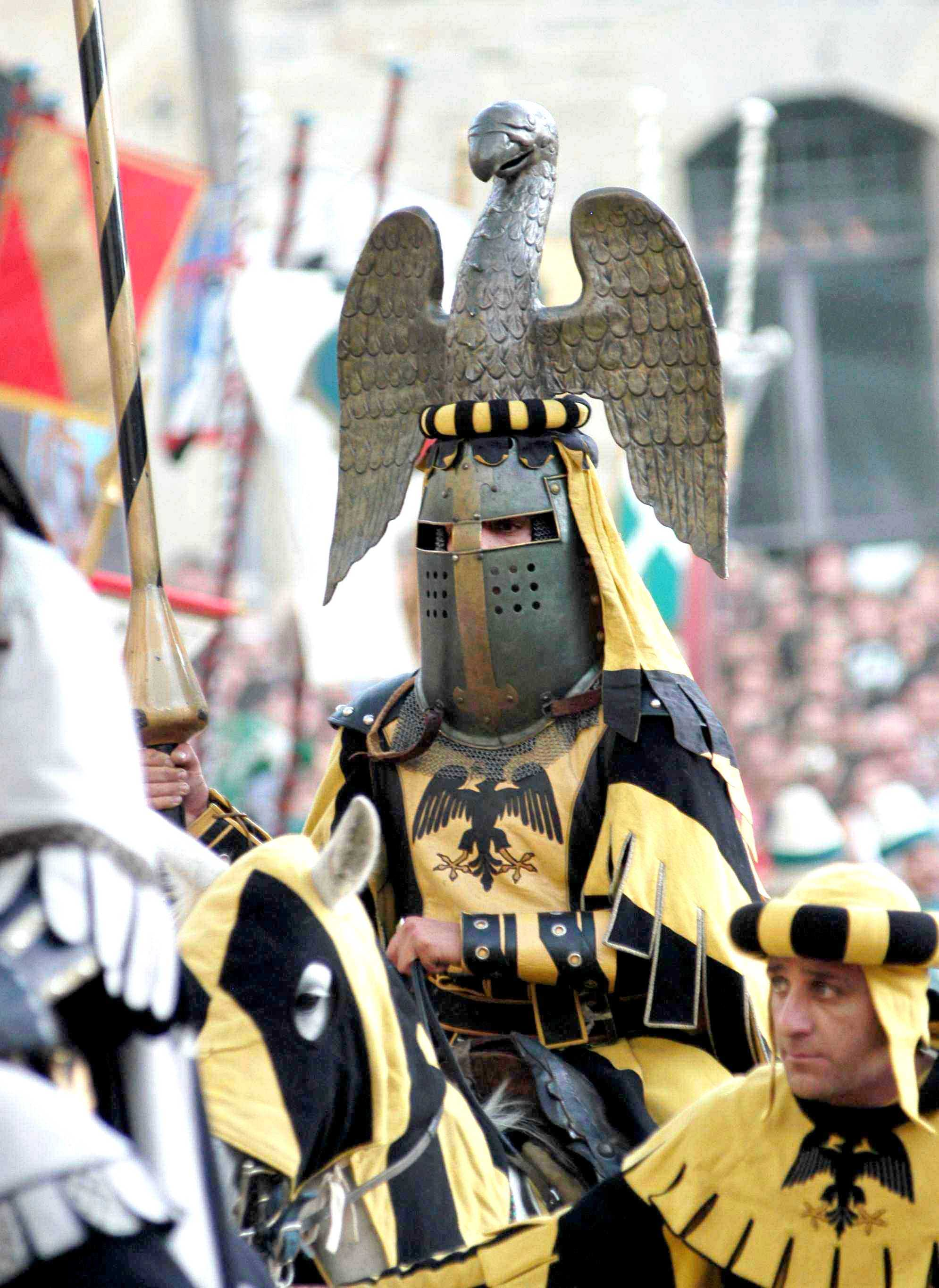

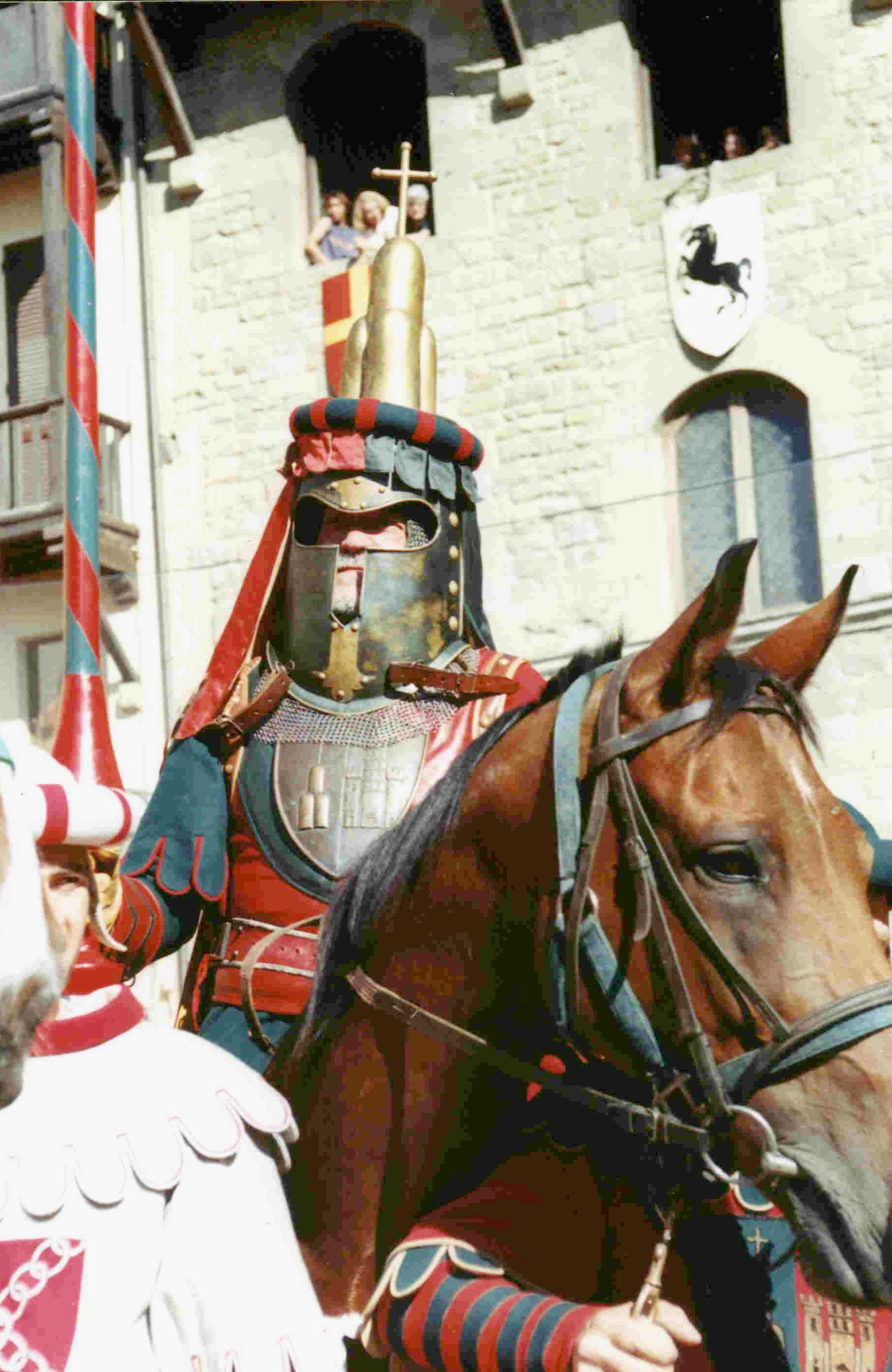

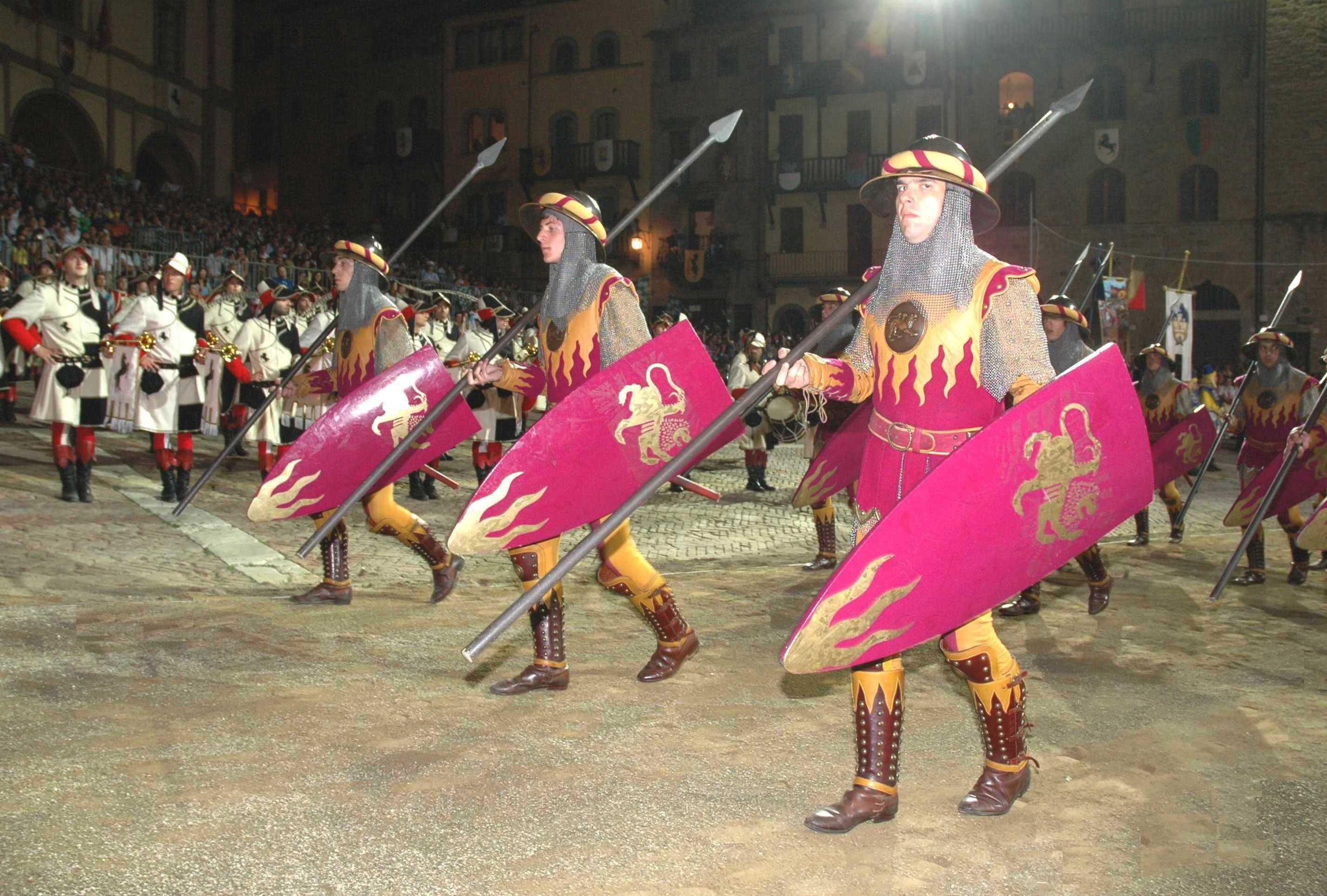

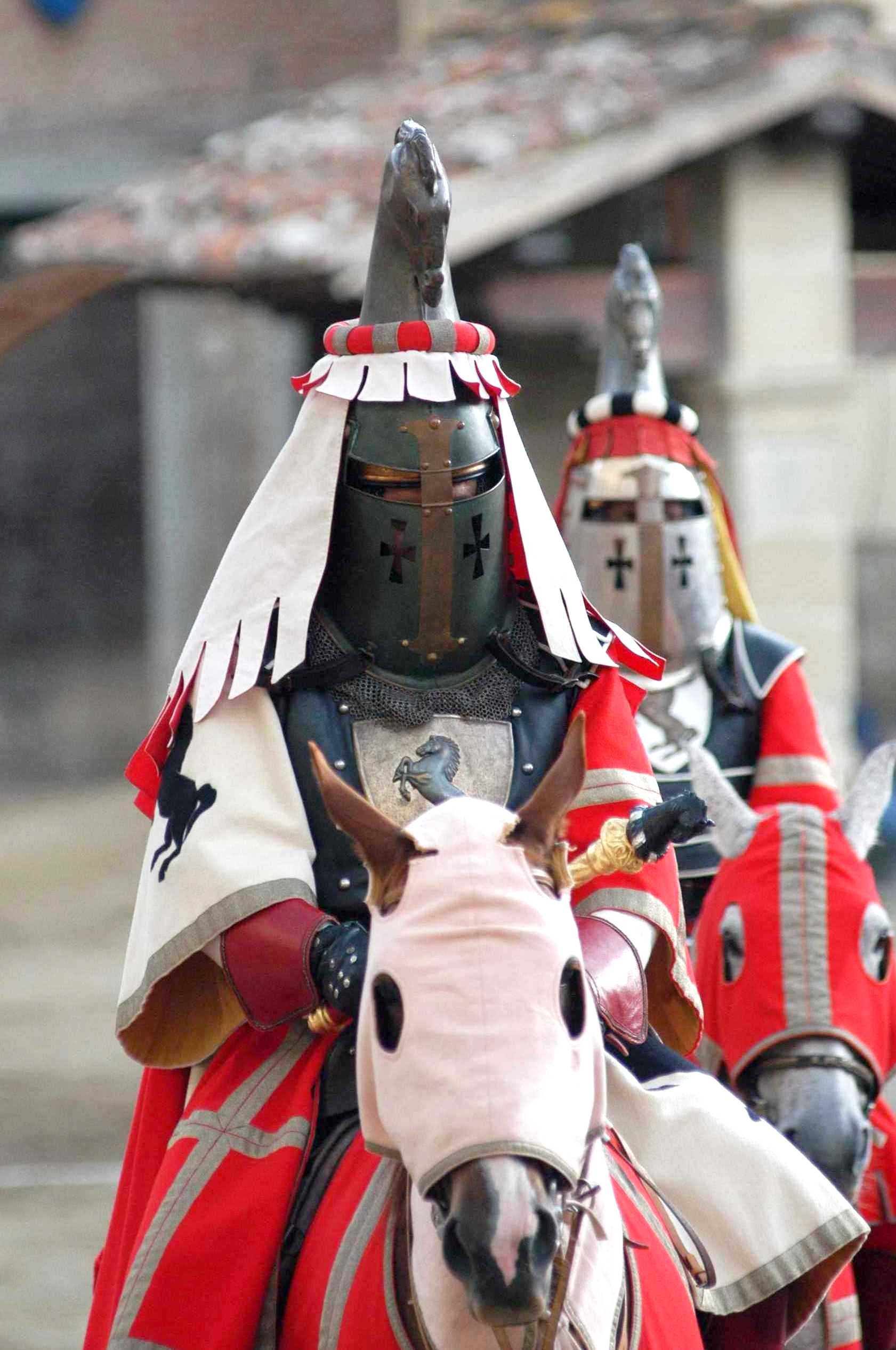
