= Lorentino d'Andrea =

Italian painter

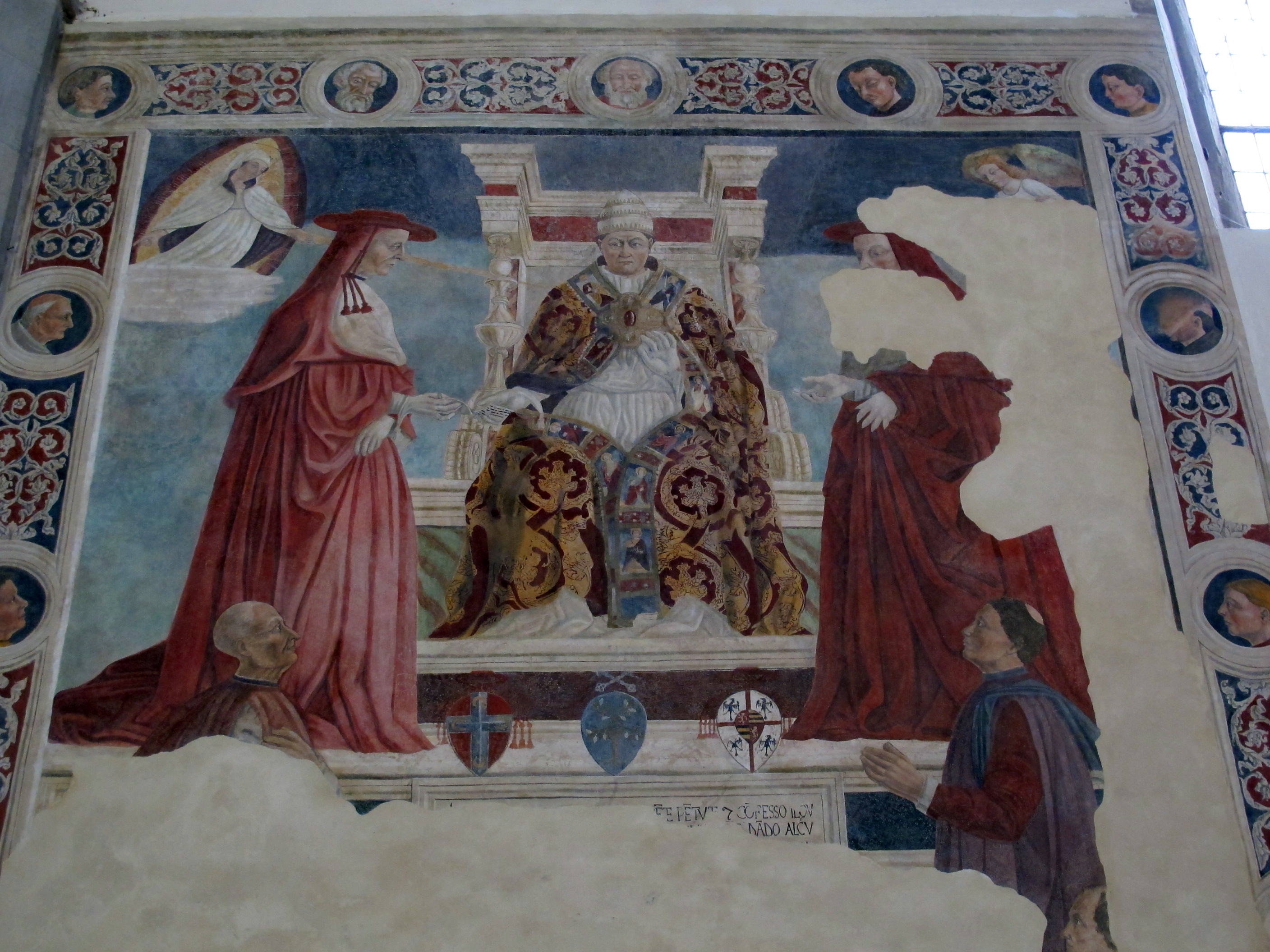
Fresco in Arezzo

Lorentino d'Andrea (c.1430–1506), was an Italian fresco painter active in Arezzo.

According to the RKD he is only known for his religious works in Arezzo.
