= Monument to Grand Duke Ferdinand III of Lorraine, Arezzo =

Coordinates: 43°28′02″N 11°52′52″E

Monument to Grand Duke Ferdinand III of Lorraine

The Monument to Grand Duke Ferdinand III of Tuscany is a Neoclassical-style marble statue and plinth initially erected in 1822 in the Piazza Grande, but now moved to the Piazza di Murello, in the town of Arezzo, region of Tuscany, Italy.

== History ==
The statue of the Grand Duke was sculpted by Stefano Ricci of Florence and inaugurated on 10 November 1822. In 1932 it was moved from its original location on the Piazza Grande to the present location at the intersection in front of Piazza di Murello. The Grand-Duke had gained some affection from the contemporary inhabitants of Arezzo for his project, directed by his minister Vittorio Fossombroni to reclaim the marshy lands of the Valdichiana, by channelling the marsh water to flow both towards the Arno river. In the monument, the Grand Duke is represented in an anachronistic Roman toga and crowned with oak leaves, a symbol of virtue, strength, perseverance and loyalty. He holds the sceptre in his hand, the emblem of power, while at his feet lies a tamed lion. On the side of the base facing Porta San Lorentino is a bas-relief attributed to the Aretine sculptor Ranieri Bartolini (1794-1856) which depicts, through an allegory, the Union between the Chiana valley and the Arno. Until a few years ago, the statue was darkened by car fumes, scarred by lichens and vandalism; the base had developed faults. During 2002-2005, it underwent restoration. In 2008 and again in 2011, the left hand of the duke was damaged by vandals.
