= Patrignone, Arezzo =

Patrignone
- Frazione
- Location of Patrignone in Italy
- Coordinates: 43°29′57″N 11°51′13″E
- Country: Italy
- Region: Tuscany
- Province: Arezzo (AR)
- Comune: Arezzo
- Elevation: 257 m (843 ft)

Population (2011)
  - Total: 405
- Time zone: UTC+1 (CET)
  - Summer (DST): UTC+2 (CEST)

Patrignone is a village in Tuscany, central Italy, administratively a frazione of the comune of Arezzo, province of Arezzo. At the time of the 2001 census its population was 425.

Patrignone is about 5 km from the city of Arezzo.

== Main sights ==
- San Michele Arcangelo, parish church (11th century)
