= Lake Montedoglio =

Artificial lake in Tuscany, Italy

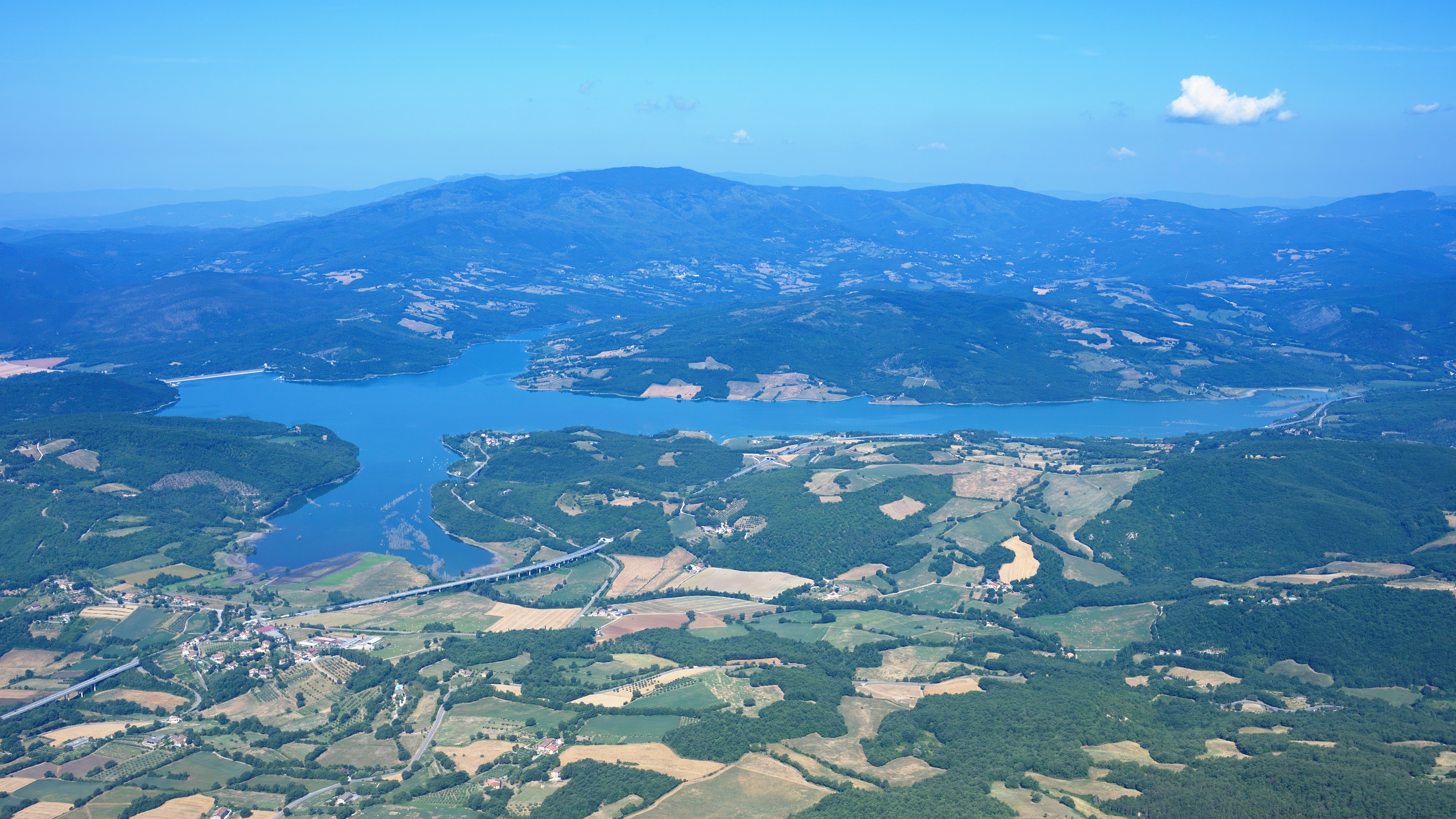

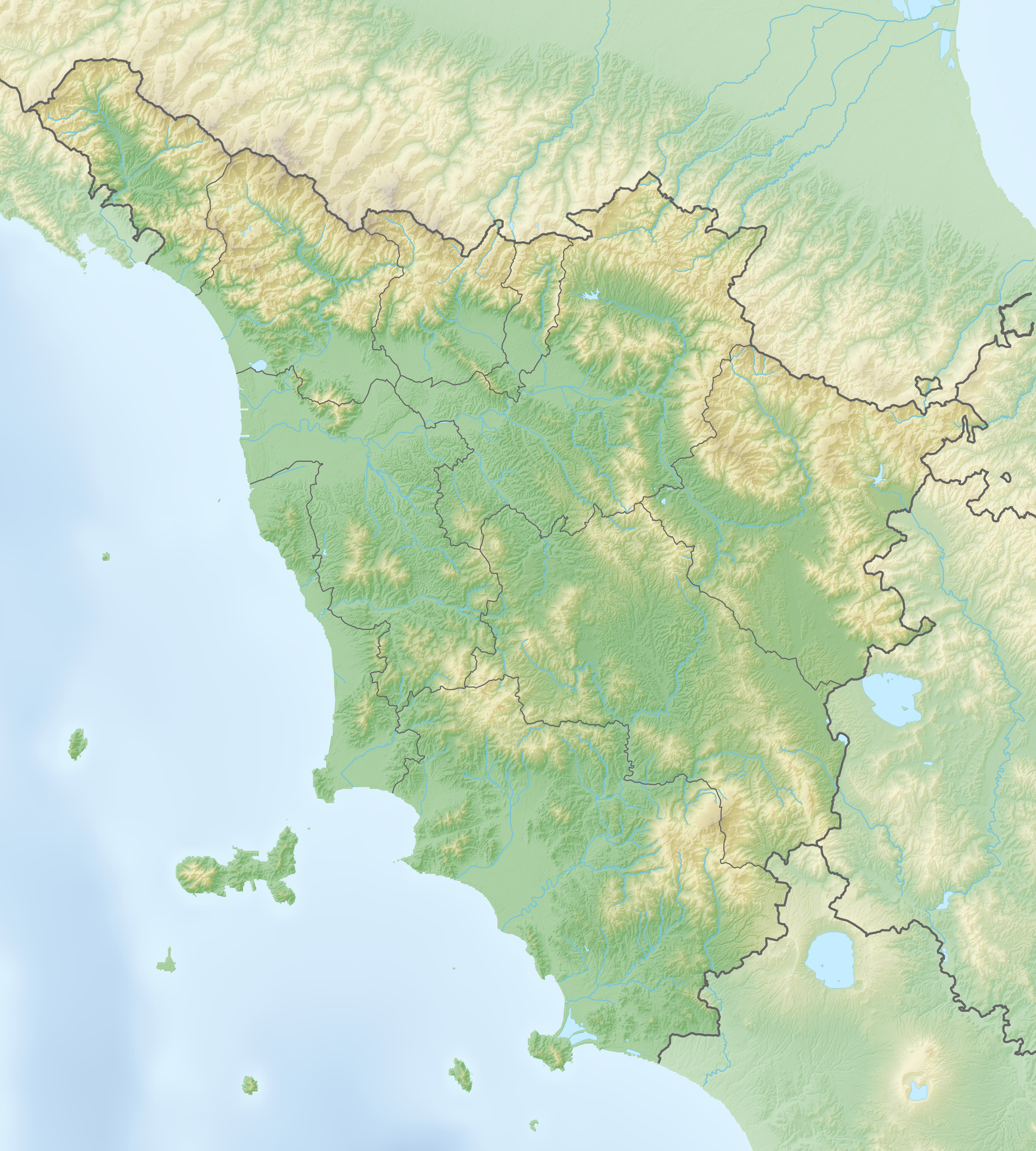
- Location within Tuscany
- Location: Province of Arezzo, Tuscany
- Coordinates: 43°36′N 12°04′E
- Type: Reservoir
- Primary inflows: Tevere, Singerna
- Primary outflows: Tevere
- Basin countries: Italy
- Surface area: 7.7 km^{2} (3.0 sq mi)
- Surface elevation: 435 m (1,427 ft)

Lake Montedoglio is the artificial lake in the Province of Arezzo, Tuscany, Italy. At an elevation of 435 m, its surface area is over 800 hectares (2,000 acres), making it the largest lake in Tuscany.

== History ==
The idea of building the Montedoglio Dam arose in the 1960's as part of a larger study conducted by the Autonomous Agency for Land Reclamation, Irrigation and Land Development in the provinces of Arezzo, Perugia, Siena, and Terni. The reservoir was intended to secure water supply for agriculture and consumption in the area surrounding the Tiber River.

Construction of the reservoir began in 1978 and was finished in 1993. The Main dam stands at 64 metres (210 ft) high and has a maximum capacity of 192,000,000 cubic metres (6.8×10^{9} cu ft) of water.

== Recreation ==
Montedoglio Lake is used for many forms of outdoor recreation including, fishing, canoeing, windsurfing, and birdwatching.
