= Angilbert II =

Archbishop of Milan from 824 to 859

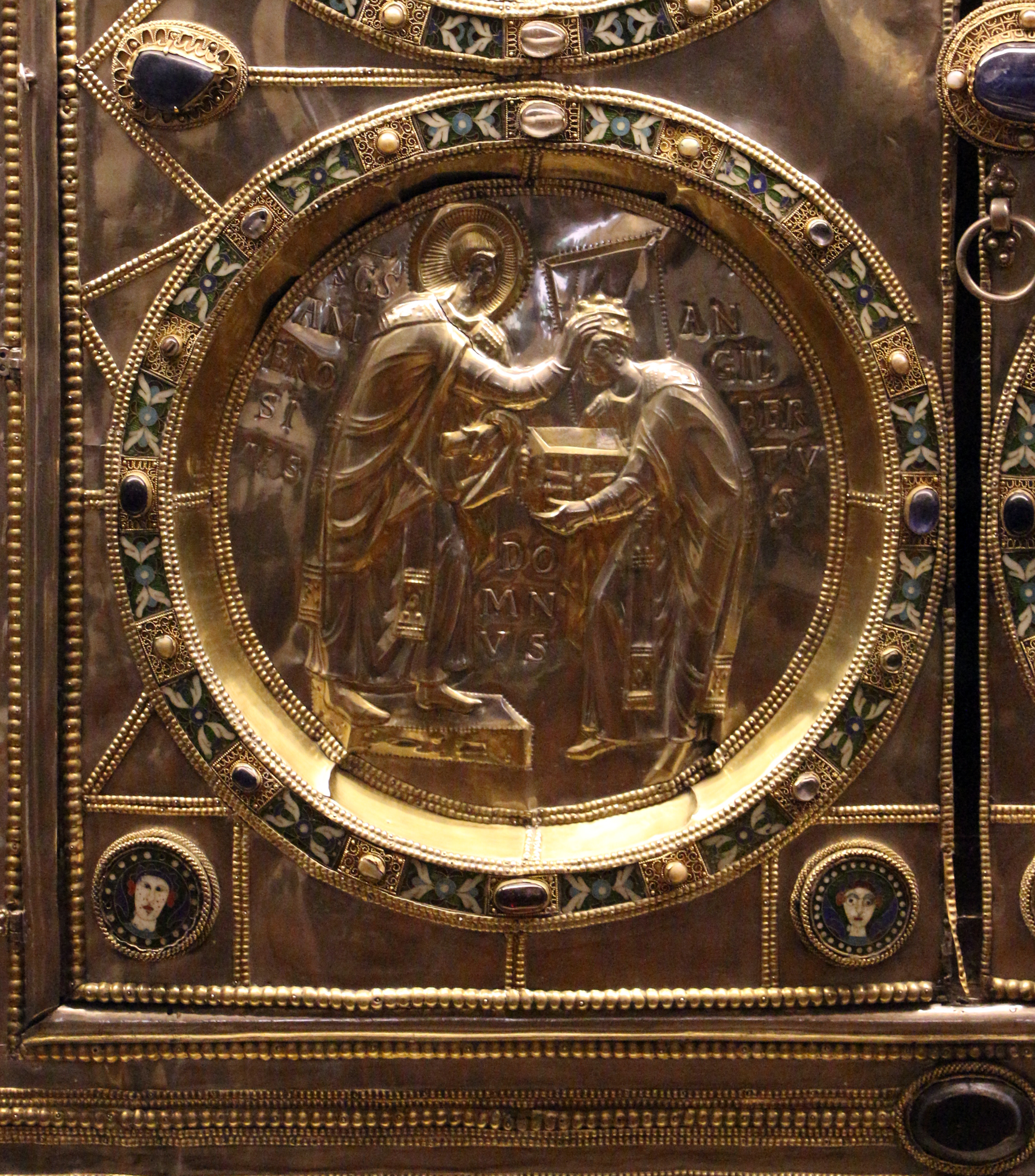
Ambrose crowning Angilbert, from the Altar of Sant'Ambrogio by Vuolvino

Angilbert II (called Angilberto da Pusterla) was the Archbishop of Milan from 27 or 28 June 824 to his death on the 13 December 859. He succeeded Angilbert I.

Like his predecessor Anselm I, who counselled Bernard to rebel in 817, Angilbert counselled the King of Italy, this time Lothair I, to revolt against his imperial sovereign in 833. In 837, he acted as an intermediary between Lothair and the emperor Louis the Pious. In 844 and again in May 859, after Lothair had attained the emperorship, Anselm was appointed to act as missus dominicus in his province. In the former year, he was in Rome for the coronation of Louis II as rex Langobardorum on 15 June. He was there again in April 850 for Louis's imperial coronation. In that year, he attended the reforming Synod of Pavia.

Angilbert also championed the cause of the deacon Anspert, later archbishop, on 20 June 857. Angilbert was the donor of a golden altar for the church of Sant'Ambrogio in Milan, and also funded its renovation.

== Sources ==
- Bertolini, Margherita Giuliana (1961). "Angilberto". Dizionario Biografico degli Italiani (in Italian). Vol. 3: Ammirato–Arcoleo. Rome: Istituto dell'Enciclopedia Italiana. OCLC 883370.
- Wickham, Chris (1981). Early Medieval Italy: Central Power and Local Society 400–1000. MacMillan Press.
