= Ambrose =

Christian bishop and theologian (c. 339–397)

Saint Ambrose of Milan
- Bishop of Milan
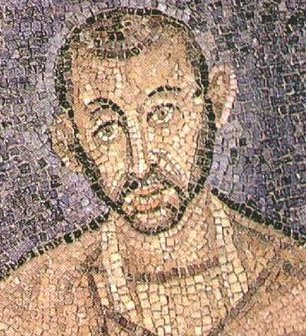
- Detail from possibly contemporary mosaic (c. 380–500) of Ambrose in the Basilica of Sant'Ambrogio
- Diocese: Mediolanum (Milan)
- See: Mediolanum
- Installed: 374 AD
- Term ended: 4 April 397
- Predecessor: Auxentius
- Successor: Simplician

Orders
- Consecration: 7 December 374

Personal details
- Born: Aurelius Ambrosius c. 339 Augusta Treverorum, Gallia Belgica, Roman Empire
- Died: 4 April 397 (aged 56–57) Mediolanum, Italia, Western Roman Empire
- Buried: Crypt of the Basilica of Sant'Ambrogio
- Denomination: Catholic

Sainthood
- Feast day: 7 December
- Venerated in: Catholic Church; Eastern Orthodox Churches; Oriental Orthodox Churches; Anglican Communion; Church of the East
- Title as Saint: Doctor of the Church
- Patronage: Milan and beekeepers Other patronage: Bakers of honeybread, bees, bishops, candlemakers, chandlers, domestic animals, the French Commissariat, geese, gingerbread makers, learning, schoolchildren, stone masons, students, wax melters and Bologna
- Shrines: Basilica of Sant'Ambrogio
- Theology career
- Notable work: De officiis ministrorum (377–391); Exameron (386–390); De obitu Theodosii (395)
- Theological work
- Era: Patristic Age
- Tradition or movement: Trinitarianism
- Main interests: Christian ethics and mariology
- Notable ideas: Anti-paganism, mother of the Church

Ambrose of Milan (Latin: Aurelius Ambrosius; c. 339 – 4 April 397), canonized as Saint Ambrose, (Note: Italian: Sant'Ambrogio [ˌsantamˈbrɔːdʒo]; Lombard: Sant Ambroeus [ˌsãːt ãˈbrøːs].) was a Roman theologian, statesman, preacher, and Bishop of Milan from 374 until his death. Trained in rhetoric and law, he served as Roman civil governor of Aemilia-Liguria at Milan before being unexpectedly chosen as bishop by popular acclamation in 374. His preaching, ecclesiastical activity, and writings made him one of the most influential Christian figures of the 4th century.

As bishop, Ambrose became a prominent defender of Christian orthodoxy, particularly against Arianism, while also attempting to mediate the conflict between the emperors Theodosius I and Magnus Maximus. He opposed the execution of Priscillianist heretics and later excommunicated Theodosius following a massacre, maintaining that "an emperor is within the church, not over it." He was also a strong advocate of monasticism and asceticism, and his theological activity helped interpret and transmit Eastern Christian theology to the Latin West.

Ambrose left a substantial body of writings. Among his important works were De Virginibus (377), on the literal and metaphorical significance of virginity and purity; De Sacramentis, which contains the earliest witness to the present Roman Canon of the Mass; and the ethical treatise De officiis ministrorum (377–391), concerned especially with the conduct of the clergy. His exegetical writings include the Exameron (386–390). Ambrose was also the author of at least four hymns, including "Veni redemptor gentium", which form the core of the corpus known as the Ambrosian hymns, alongside other hymns traditionally attributed to him. He exercised a notable influence on Augustine of Hippo, whom he helped convert to Christianity.

In Western Christianity, Ambrose came to be recognized alongside Augustine, Jerome, and Pope Gregory the Great as one of the four Great Latin Church Fathers. He was also one of the four original Western Doctors of the Church, formally declared Doctors in 1298. He is venerated as a saint in the Catholic Church, Eastern Orthodox Church, Anglican Communion, and various Lutheran denominations, and is the patron saint of Milan and beekeepers. His feast day is usually observed on 7 December.

== Background and career ==
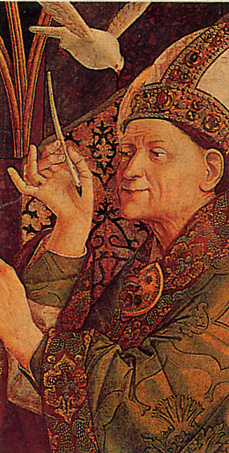
Painting by Michael Pacher

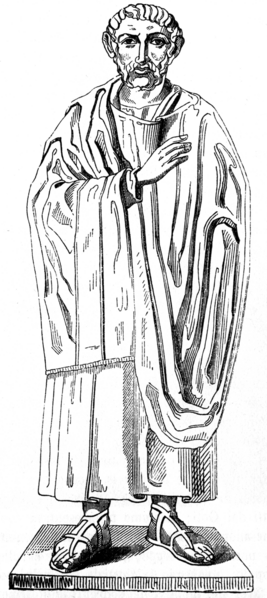
Engraving of a statue of Ambrose

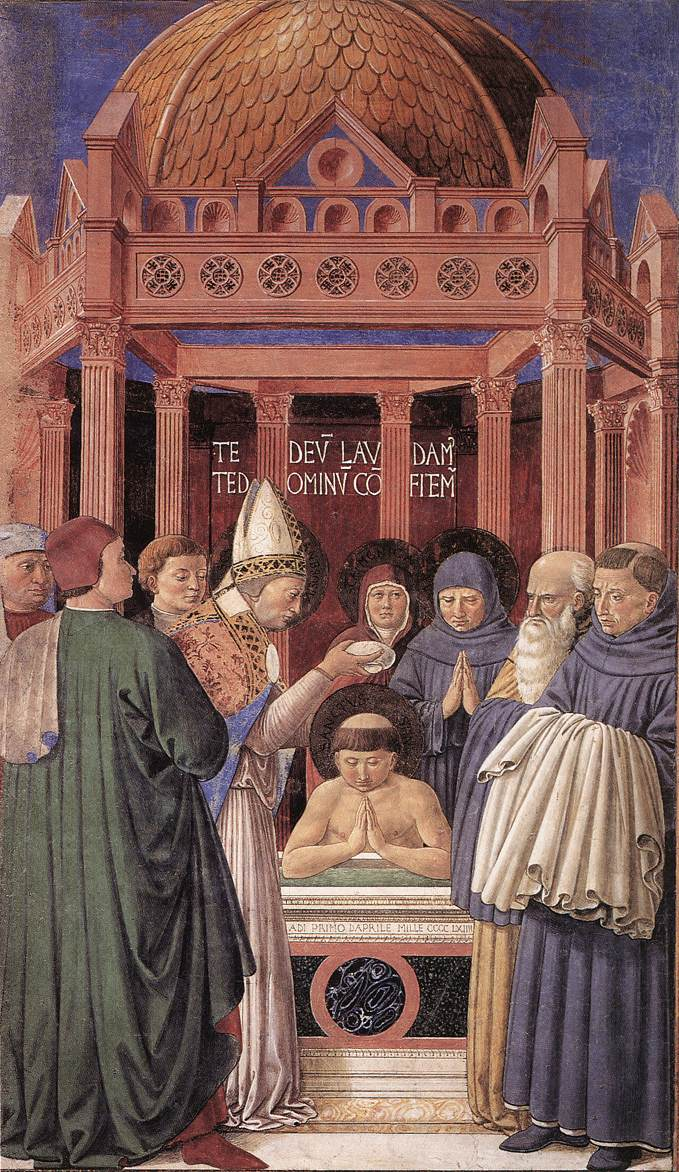
Fresco of Ambrose baptizing Saint Augustine, by Benozzo Gozzoli

Legends about Ambrose had spread through the empire long before his biography was written, making it difficult for modern historians to understand his true character and fairly place his behaviour within the context of antiquity. Most agree he was the personification of his era. This would make Ambrose a genuinely spiritual man who spoke up and defended his faith against opponents, an aristocrat who retained many of the attitudes and practices of a Roman governor, and also an ascetic who served the poor.

=== Early life ===
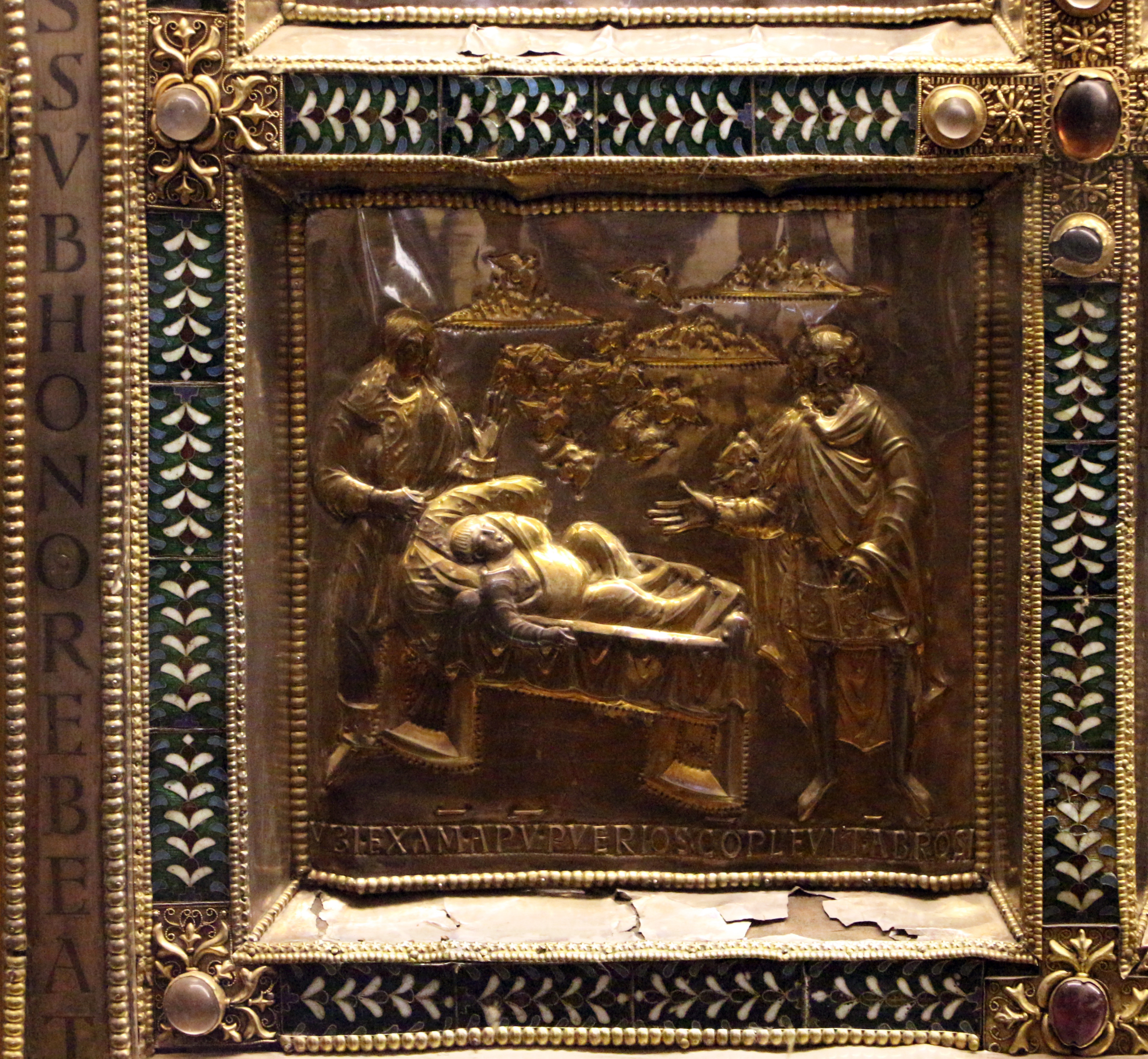
Relief by Vuolvino depicting Ambrose as a child while bees swarm his crib. His father is on the right of the image while the sky has three clouds "sending forth flames". The relief is from the Altar of Sant'Ambrogio in the Basilica of Sant'Ambrogio.

Ambrose was born into a Roman Christian family, of Greek descent, in the year 339. Ambrose himself wrote that he was 53 years old in his letter number 49, which has been dated to 392. He began life in Augusta Treverorum (modern Trier) the capital of the Roman province of Gallia Belgica in what was then northeastern Gaul and is now in the Rhineland-Palatinate in Germany. Scholars disagree on who exactly his father was. His father is sometimes identified with Aurelius Ambrosius, (Note: "S. Paulinus in Vit. Ambr. 3 has the following: posito in administratione prefecture Galliarum patre eius Ambrosio natus est Ambrosius. From this, practically all of Ambrose's biographers have concluded that Ambrose's father was a praetorian prefect in Gaul. This is the only evidence we have, however, that there ever was an Ambrose as prefect in Gaul.") a praetorian prefect of Gaul; but some scholars identify his father as an official named Uranius who received an imperial constitution dated 3 February 339 (addressed in a brief extract from one of the three emperors ruling in 339, Constantine II, Constantius II, or Constans, in the Codex Theodosianus, book XI.5). What does seem certain is that Ambrose was born in Trier and his father was either the praetorian prefect or part of his administration.

A legend about Ambrose as an infant recounts that a swarm of bees settled on his face while he lay in his cradle, leaving behind a drop of honey. His father is said to have considered this a sign of his future eloquence and honeyed tongue. Bees and beehives often appear in the saint's symbology.

Ambrose's mother was a woman of intellect and piety. It was probable that she was a member of the Roman family Aurelii Symmachi, which would make Ambrose a cousin of the orator Quintus Aurelius Symmachus. The family had produced one martyr (the virgin Soteris) in its history. Ambrose was the youngest of three children. His siblings were Satyrus, the subject of Ambrose's De excessu fratris Satyri, and Marcellina, who made a profession of virginity sometime between 352 and 355; Pope Liberius himself conferred the veil upon her. Both Ambrose's siblings also became venerated as saints.

Sometime early in the life of Ambrose, his father died. At an unknown later date, his mother left Trier with her three children, and the family moved to Rome. There Ambrose studied literature, law, and rhetoric. He then followed in his father's footsteps and entered public service. Praetorian Prefect Sextus Claudius Petronius Probus first gave him a place as a judicial councillor, and then in about 372 made him governor of the province of Liguria and Emilia, with headquarters in Milan.

=== Bishop of Milan ===
In 374 the bishop of Milan, Auxentius, an Arian, died, and the Arians challenged the succession. Ambrose went to the church where the election was to take place to prevent an uproar which seemed probable in this crisis. His address was interrupted by a call, "Ambrose, bishop!", which was taken up by the whole assembly.

Ambrose, though known to be Nicene Christian in belief, was considered acceptable to Arians due to the charity he had shown concerning their beliefs. At first, he energetically refused the office of bishop, for which he felt he was in no way prepared: Ambrose was a relatively new Christian who was not yet baptized nor formally trained in theology. Ambrose fled to a colleague's home, seeking to hide. Upon receiving a letter from the Emperor Gratian praising the appropriateness of Rome appointing individuals worthy of holy positions, Ambrose's host gave him up. Within a week, he was baptized, ordained and duly consecrated as the new bishop of Milan. This was the first time in the West that a member of the upper class of high officials had accepted the office of bishop.

As bishop, he immediately adopted an ascetic lifestyle, apportioned his money to the poor, donating all of his land, making only provision for his sister Marcellina. While Bishop of Milan, Ambrose carefully cultivated practices that respected local customs and that reflected his spiritual beliefs. He understood the link between a religious leader's life and their ability to model morality for congregants. In his work De Officiis (377–391), he asked, "How can you consider a man to be better than you when it comes to giving advice if you see that he is worse than you when it comes to morality?" His humble and upright ways raised his standing among his people even further; it was his popularity with the people that gave him considerable political leverage throughout his career. Upon the unexpected appointment of Ambrose to the episcopate, his brother Satyrus resigned a prefecture in order to move to Milan, where he took over managing the diocese's temporal affairs.

=== Arianism ===
Arius (died 336) was a Christian priest who around the year 300 asserted that God the Father must have created the Son, indicating that the Son was a lesser being who was not eternal and of a different "essence" from God the Father. This Christology, though contrary to tradition, quickly spread through Egypt, Libya and other Roman provinces. Bishops engaged in the dispute, and the people divided into parties, sometimes demonstrating in the streets in support of one side or the other.

Arianism appealed to many high-level leaders and clergy in both the Western and Eastern empires. Although the western Emperor Gratian (r. 367–383) supported orthodoxy, his younger half brother Valentinian II, who became his colleague in the empire in 375, adhered to the Arian creed. Ambrose sought to refute Arian propositions theologically, but Ambrose did not sway the young prince's position. In the East, Emperor Theodosius I (r. 379–395) likewise professed the Nicene creed; but there were many adherents of Arianism throughout his dominions, especially among the higher clergy.

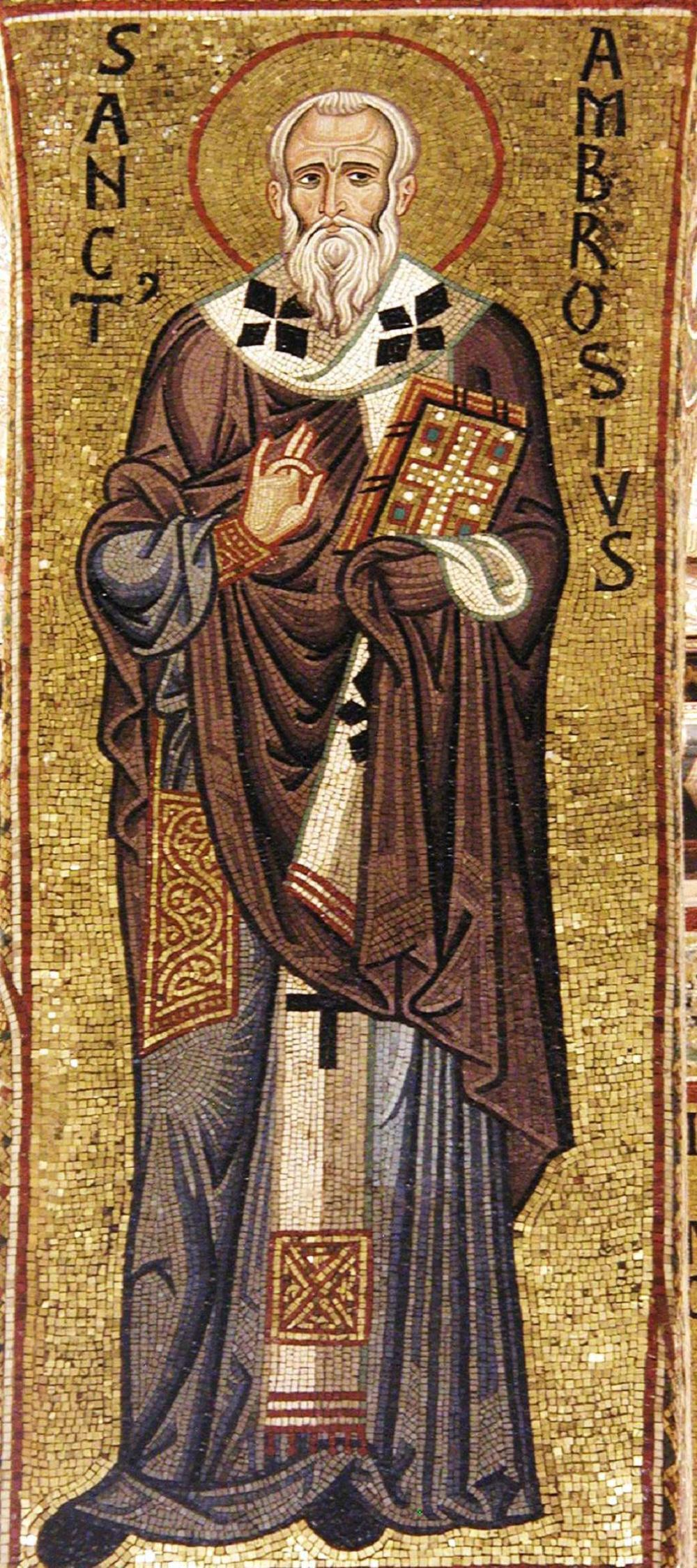
Mosaic of Saint Ambrose from the Cappella Palatina in Palermo, Italy (1140)

In this state of religious ferment, two leaders of the Arians, bishops Palladius of Ratiaria and Secundianus of Singidunum, confident of numbers, prevailed upon Gratian to call a general council from all parts of the empire. This request appeared so equitable that Gratian complied without hesitation. However, Ambrose feared the consequences and prevailed upon the emperor to have the matter determined by a council of the Western bishops. Accordingly, a synod composed of thirty-two bishops was held at Aquileia in the year 381. Ambrose was elected president and Palladius, being called upon to defend his opinions, declined. A vote was then taken and Palladius and his associate Secundianus were deposed from their episcopal offices.

Ambrose struggled with Arianism for over half of his term in the episcopate. Ecclesiastical unity was important to the church, but it was no less important to the state, and as a Roman, Ambrose felt strongly about that. Conflict over heresies loomed large in an age of religious ferment comparable to the Reformation of the fourteenth and fifteenth centuries. Orthodox Christianity was determining how to define itself as it faced multiple challenges on both a theological and a practical level, and Ambrose exercised crucial influence at a crucial time.

=== Imperial relations ===
Ambrose had good relations and varying levels of influence with the Roman emperors Gratian, Valentinian II and Theodosius I, but exactly how much influence, what kind of influence, in what ways, and when, has been debated in the scholarship of the late twentieth and early twenty-first centuries.

==== Gratian ====
It has long been convention to see Gratian and Ambrose as having a personal friendship, putting Ambrose in the dominant role of spiritual guide, but modern scholars now find this view hard to support from the sources. The ancient Christian historian Sozomen (c. 400 – c. 450) is the only ancient source that shows Ambrose and Gratian together in any personal interaction. In that interaction, Sozomen relates that, in the last year of Gratian's reign, Ambrose intruded on Gratian's private hunting party in order to appeal on behalf of a pagan senator sentenced to die. After years of acquaintance, according to professor Neil B. McLynn, this indicates that Ambrose could not take for granted that Gratian would see him, so instead, Ambrose had to resort to such manoeuvrings to make his appeal.

Gratian was personally devout long before meeting Ambrose. Modern scholarship indicates Gratian's religious policies do not evidence capitulation to Ambrose more than they evidence Gratian's own views. Gratian's devotion did lead Ambrose to write a large number of books and letters of theology and spiritual commentary dedicated to the emperor. The sheer volume of these writings and the effusive praise they contain has led many historians to conclude that Gratian was dominated by Ambrose, and it was that dominance that produced Gratian's anti-pagan actions. McLynn asserts that effusive praises were common in everyone's correspondence with the crown. He adds that Gratian's actions were determined by the constraints of the system as much as "by his own initiatives or Ambrose's influence".

McLynn asserts that the largest influence on Gratian's policy was the profound change in political circumstances produced by the Battle of Adrianople in 378. Gratian had become involved in fighting the Goths the previous year and had been on his way to the Balkans when his uncle and the "cream of the eastern army" were destroyed at Adrianople. Gratian withdrew to Sirmium and set up his court there. Several rival groups, including the Arians, sought to secure benefits from the government at Sirmium. In an Arian attempt to undermine Ambrose, whom Gratian had not yet met, Gratian was "warned" that Ambrose's faith was suspect. Gratian took steps to investigate by writing to Ambrose and asking him to explain his faith.

Ambrose and Gratian first met, after this, in 379 during a visit to Milan. The bishop made a good impression on Gratian and his court, which was a mixture of Christian and aristocratic – much like Ambrose himself. (Note: Two laws were recorded from this time. One of these cancelled the "law of toleration" Gratian had previously issued at Sirmium. This toleration allowed freedom of worship to all with the exception of the heretical Manichaeans, Photinians and Eunomians. The law cancelling this has been presented in previous scholarship as proof of Ambrose's influence over Gratian, but the law's target was Donatism which had failed to be listed in the exceptions. There is no evidence to support Ambrose as having had anything to do with this restatement since sanctions against Donatism had existed since Constantine.) The emperor returned to Milan in 380 to find that Ambrose had complied with his request for a statement of his faith – in two volumes – known as De Fide: a statement of orthodoxy and of Ambrose' political theology, as well as a polemic against the Arian heresy – intended for public discussion. The emperor had not asked to be instructed by Ambrose, and in De Fide Ambrose states this clearly. Nor was he asked to refute the Arians. He was asked to justify his own position, but in the end, he did all three.

It seems that by 382 Ambrose had replaced Ausonius to become a major influence in Gratian's court. Ambrose had not yet become the "conscience" of kings he would in the later 380s, but he did speak out against reinstating the Altar of Victory. In 382, Gratian was the first to divert public financial subsidies that had previously supported Rome's cults. Before that year, contributions in support of the ancient customs had continued unchallenged by the state.

==== Valentinian II ====
The childless Gratian had treated his younger brother Valentinian II like a son. Ambrose, on the other hand, had incurred the lasting enmity of Valentinian II's mother, the Empress Justina, in the winter of 379 by helping to appoint a Nicene bishop in Sirmium. Not long after this, Valentinian II, his mother, and the court left Sirmium; Sirmium had come under Theodosius' control, so they went to Milan which was ruled by Gratian.

In 383 Gratian was assassinated at Lyon, in Gaul (France) by Magnus Maximus. Valentinian II was twelve years old, and the assassination left his mother, Justina, in a position of something akin to a regent. In 385 (or 386) the emperor Valentinian II and his mother Justina, along with a considerable number of clergy, the laity, and the military, professed Arianism. Conflict between Ambrose and Justina soon followed.

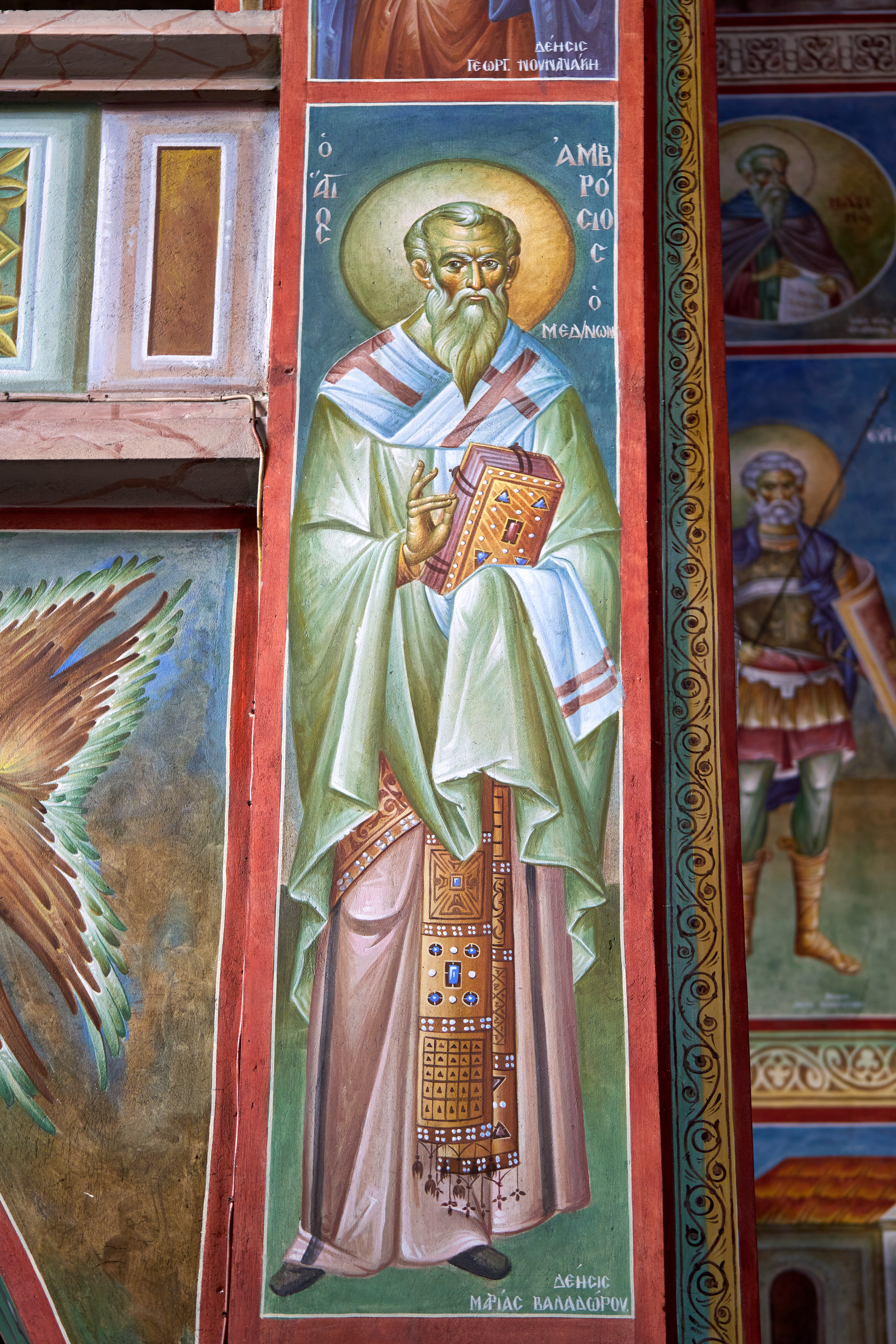
Fresco of Saint Ambrose from Hagia Triada Cathedral, Piraeus

The Arians demanded that Valentinian II allocate to them two churches in Milan: one in the city (the Basilica of the Apostles), the other in the suburbs (St Victor's). Ambrose refused to surrender the churches. He answered by saying that "What belongs to God, is outside the emperor's power." In this, Ambrose called on an ancient Roman principle: a temple set apart to a god became the property of that god. Ambrose now applied this ancient legal principle to the Christian churches, seeing the bishop, as a divine representative, as guardian of his god's property.

Subsequently, while Ambrose was performing the Liturgy of the Hours in the basilica, the prefect of the city came to persuade him to give it up to the Arians. Ambrose again refused. Certain deans (officers of the court) were sent to take possession of the basilica by hanging upon it imperial escutcheons. Instead, soldiers from the ranks the emperor had placed around the basilica began pouring into the church, assuring Ambrose of their fidelity. The escutcheons outside the church were removed, and legend says the children tore them to shreds.

Ambrose refused to surrender the basilica, and sent sharp answers back to his emperor: "If you demand my person, I am ready to submit: carry me to prison or to death, I will not resist; but I will never betray the church of Christ. I will not call upon the people to succour me; I will die at the foot of the altar rather than desert it. The tumult of the people I will not encourage: but God alone can appease it." By Thursday, the emperor gave in, bitterly responding: "Soon, if Ambrose gives the orders, you will be sending me to him in chains."

In 386, Justina and Valentinian II received the Arian bishop Auxentius the younger, and Ambrose was again ordered to hand over a church in Milan for Arian usage. Ambrose and his congregation barricaded themselves inside the church, and again the imperial order was rescinded. There was an attempted kidnapping, and another attempt to arrest him and to force him to leave the city. Several accusations were made, but unlike in the case of John Chrysostom, no formal charges were brought. The emperor certainly had the power to do so, and probably did not solely because of Ambrose's popularity with the people and what they might do.

When Magnus Maximus usurped power in Gaul (383) and was considering a descent upon Italy, Valentinian II sent Ambrose to dissuade him, and the embassy was successful (384). A second, later embassy was unsuccessful. Magnus Maximus entered Italy (386–387) and Milan was taken. Justina and her son fled, but Ambrose remained and had the plate of the church melted for the relief of the poor.

Magnus Maximus's entry into Italy and the emperor's flight to the east left his coemperor Theodosius little choice but to reply in force. After defeating the usurper at Aquileia in 388, Theodosius returned with the restored emperor to Milan, where he likely met Ambrose for the first time. As Valentinian II was only seventeen years old, Theodosius remained in Italy for a time to ensure the western half of the empire was stable. He appointed his trusted Frankish general, Arbogast, as magister militum. Tensions between Arbogast and Valentinian II quickly escalated until Valentinian II was found hanged in his bedchamber by apparent suicide. Because the young emperor had recently been in a public confrontation with Arbogast, contemporary sources and historians have been unable to definitively determine whether Valentinian II's death was suicide or murder.

Ambrose performed the funeral for Valentinian II and his eulogy is the only contemporary Western source for Valentinian II's death. The eulogy makes reference to the heavy yoke of duties the emperor carried and the ignorance of youth, in which God might find forgiveness for sins. While never directly touching on the possibility of suicide, such themes may have been intended to comfort his Christian audience, for whom suicide was a sin.

==== Theodosius ====
While Ambrose was writing De Fide, Theodosius published his own statement of faith in 381 in an edict establishing Nicene Christianity as the only legitimate version of the Christian faith. There is unanimity amongst scholars that this represents the emperor's own beliefs. The aftermath of the death (378) of Valens (Emperor in the East from 364 to 378) had left many questions for the church unresolved, and Theodosius' edict can be seen as an effort to begin addressing those questions. Theodosius' natural generosity was tempered by his pressing need to establish himself and to publicly assert his personal piety.

On 28 February 380, Theodosius issued the Edict of Thessalonica, a decree addressed to the city of Constantinople, determining that only Christians who did not support Arian views were catholic and could have their places of worship officially recognized as "churches". (Note: Recent scholarship has tended to reject former views that the edict was a key step in establishing Christianity as the official religion of the empire since it was aimed exclusively at Constantinople and seems to have gone largely unnoticed by contemporaries outside the capital. Nonetheless, the edict is the first known secular Roman law to positively assert a religious orthodoxy.) The Edict opposed Arianism, and attempted to establish unity in Christianity and to suppress heresy. German ancient historian Karl Leo Noethlichs writes that the Edict of Thessalonica was neither anti-pagan nor antisemitic; it did not declare Christianity to be the official religion of the empire; and it gave no advantage to Christians over other faiths.

Liebeschuetz and Hill indicate that it was not until after 388, during Theodosius' stay in Milan following the defeat of Maximus in 388, that Theodosius and Ambrose first met.

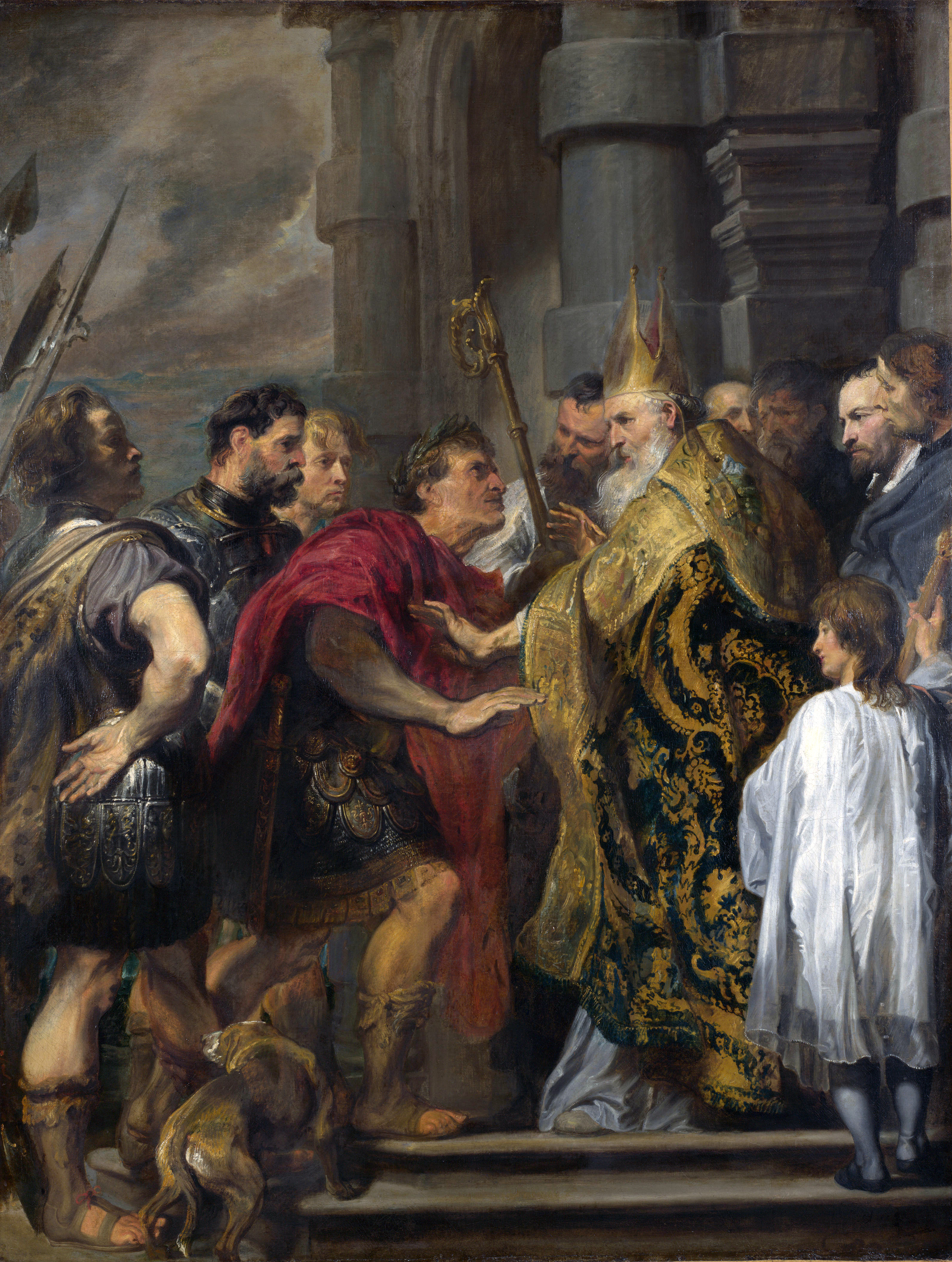
Saint Ambrose barring Theodosius from Milan Cathedral a "pious fiction" painted in 1619 by Anthony van Dyck. National Gallery, London

After the Massacre of Thessalonica in 390, Theodosius made an act of public penance at Ambrose's behest. Ambrose was away from court during the events at Thessalonica, but after being informed of them, he wrote Theodosius a letter. In that still-existing letter, Ambrose presses for a semi-public demonstration of penitence from the emperor, telling him that, as his bishop, he will not give Theodosius communion until it is done. Wolf Liebeschuetz says "Theodosius duly complied and came to church without his imperial robes, until Christmas, when Ambrose openly admitted him to communion".

Formerly, some scholars credited Ambrose with having an undue influence over Emperor Theodosius I, from this period forward, prompting him toward major anti-pagan legislation beginning in February of 391. However, this interpretation has been heavily disputed since the late-twentieth century. McLynn argues that Theodosius's anti-pagan legislation was too limited in scope for it to be of interest to the bishop. The fabled encounter at the door of the cathedral in Milan, with Ambrose as the mitred prelate braced, blocking Theodosius from entering, which has sometimes been seen as evidence of Ambrose' dominance over Theodosius, has been debunked by modern historians as "a pious fiction". There was no encounter at the church door. The story is a product of the imagination of Theodoret, a historian of the fifth century who wrote of the events of 390 "using his own ideology to fill the gaps in the historical record".

The twenty-first-century view is that Ambrose was "not a power behind the throne". The two men did not meet each other frequently, and documents that reveal the relationship between the two are less about personal friendship than they are about negotiations between two formidable leaders of the powerful institutions they represent: the Roman State and the Italian Church. Cameron says there is no evidence that Ambrose was a significant influence on the emperor.

For centuries after his death, Theodosius was regarded as a champion of Christian orthodoxy who decisively stamped out paganism. This view was recorded by Theodoret, who is recognized as an unreliable historian, in the century following their deaths. Theodosius's predecessors Constantine (r. 306–337), Constantius (r. 337–361), and Valens had all been semi-Arians. Therefore, it fell to the orthodox Theodosius to receive from Christian literary tradition most of the credit for the final triumph of Christianity. Modern scholars see this as an interpretation of history by orthodox Christian writers more than as a representation of actual history. The view of a pious Theodosius submitting meekly to the authority of the church, represented by Ambrose, is part of the myth that evolved within a generation of their deaths.

=== Later years and death ===
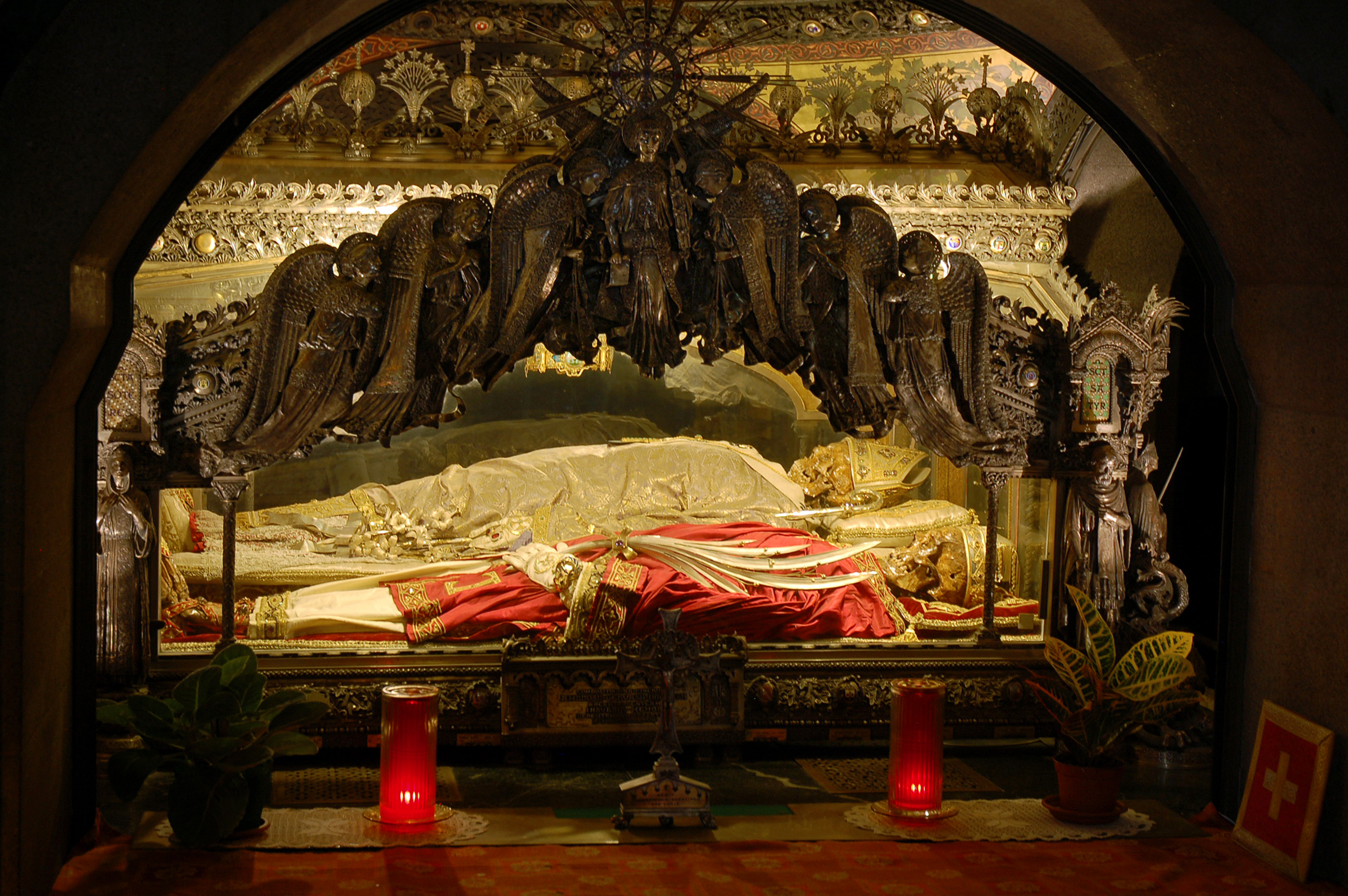
Embossed silver urn with the body of Ambrose (with white vestments) in the crypt of Sant'Ambrose, next to the skeleton of either Saint Gervase or Saint Protase

In April 393 Arbogast (magister militum of the West) and his puppet Emperor Eugenius marched into Italy to consolidate their position against Theodosius I and his son, Honorius, now appointed Augustus to govern the western portion of the empire. Arbogast and Eugenius courted Ambrose's support by very obliging letters; but before they arrived at Milan, he had retired to Bologna, where he assisted at the translation of the relics of Saints Vitalis and Agricola. From there he went to Florence, where he remained until Eugenius withdrew from Milan to meet Theodosius in the Battle of the Frigidus in early September 394.

Soon after acquiring the undisputed possession of the Roman Empire, Theodosius died at Milan in 395, and Ambrose gave the eulogy. Two years later (4 April 397) Ambrose also died. He was succeeded as bishop of Milan by Simplician. Ambrose's body may still be viewed in the church of Saint Ambrogio in Milan, where it has been continuously venerated – along with the bodies identified in his time as being those of Saints Gervase and Protase.

== Feast day ==
Ambrose is remembered in the calendar of the Roman Rite of the Catholic Church on 7 December, and is also honoured in the Church of England and in the Episcopal Church on 7 December. Pope Paul VI, who had also served as bishop in Milan, closed the Second Vatican Council on 7 December 1965, noting that Ambrose's feast was celebrated that day.

== Character ==
In 1994, Neil B. McLynn wrote a complex study of Ambrose that focused on his politics and was intended to "demonstrate that Ambrose viewed community as a means to acquire personal political power". Subsequent studies of how Ambrose handled his episcopal responsibilities, his Nicene theology and his dealings with the Arians in his episcopate, his pastoral care, his commitment to community, and his personal asceticism, have mitigated this view.

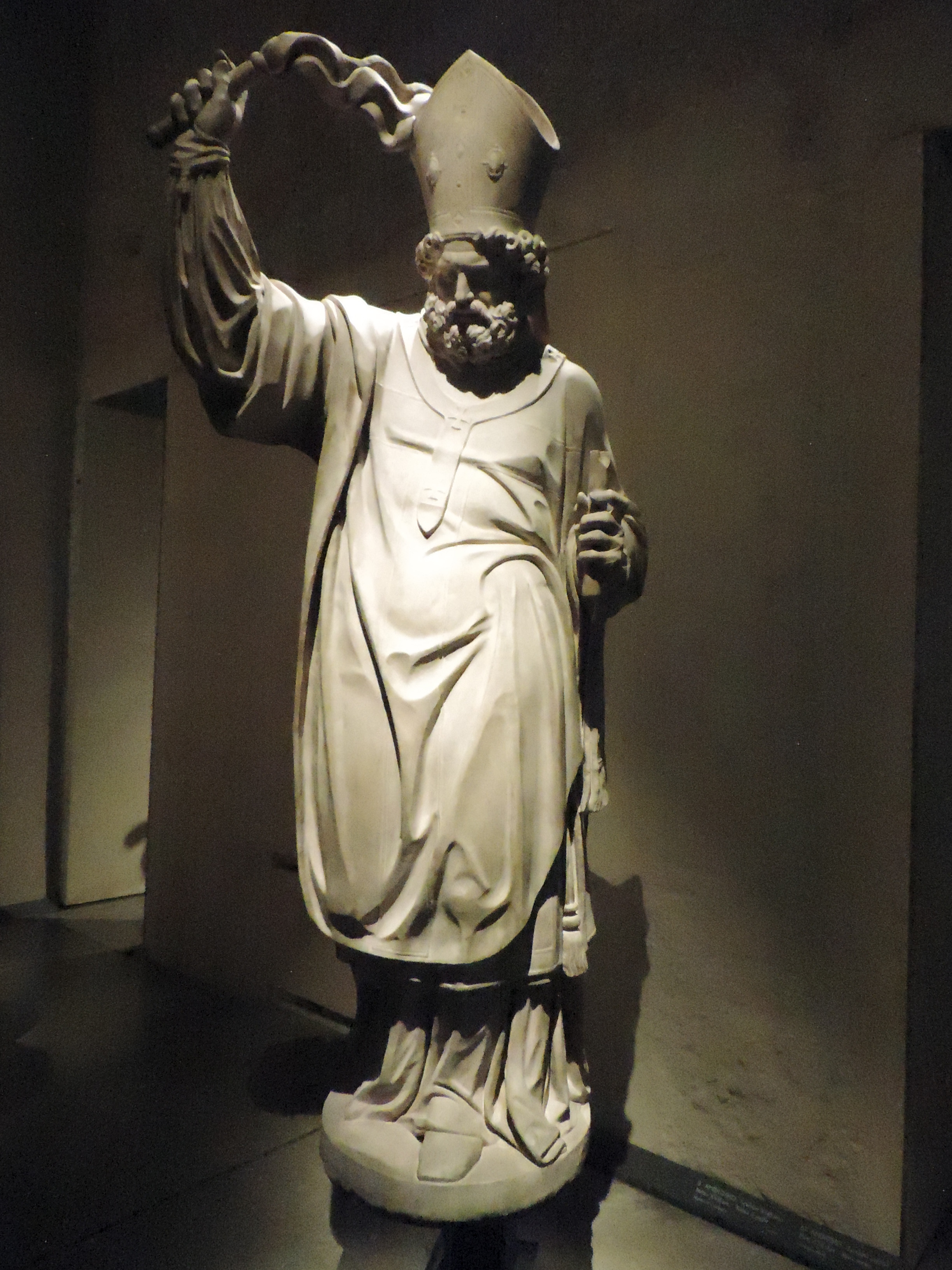
Statue of Saint Ambrose with a scourge in Museo del Duomo, Milan. Unknown Lombard author, early 17th century.

All of Ambrose's writings are works of advocacy for Nicene Christianity, and even his political views and actions were closely related to his religion. He was rarely, if ever, concerned about simply recording what had happened; he did not write to reveal his inner thoughts and struggles; he wrote to advocate for his God. Boniface Ramsey writes that it is difficult "not to posit a deep spirituality in a man" who wrote on the mystical meanings of the Song of Songs and wrote many extraordinary hymns. Despite an abiding spirituality, Ambrose had a generally straightforward manner, and a practical rather than a speculative tendency in his thinking. De Officiis is a utilitarian guide for his clergy in their daily ministry in the Milanese church rather than "an intellectual tour de force".

Christian faith in the third century developed the monastic lifestyle which subsequently spread into the rest of Roman society in a general practice of virginity, voluntary poverty and self-denial for religious reasons. This lifestyle was embraced by many new converts, including Ambrose, even though they did not become actual monks.

The bishops of this era had heavy administrative responsibilities, and Ambrose was also sometimes occupied with imperial affairs, but he still fulfilled his primary responsibility to care for the well-being of his flock. He preached and celebrated the Eucharist multiple times a week, sometimes daily, and dealt directly with the needs of the poor, as well as widows and orphans, "virgins" (nuns), and his own clergy. He replied to letters personally, practised hospitality, and made himself available to the people.

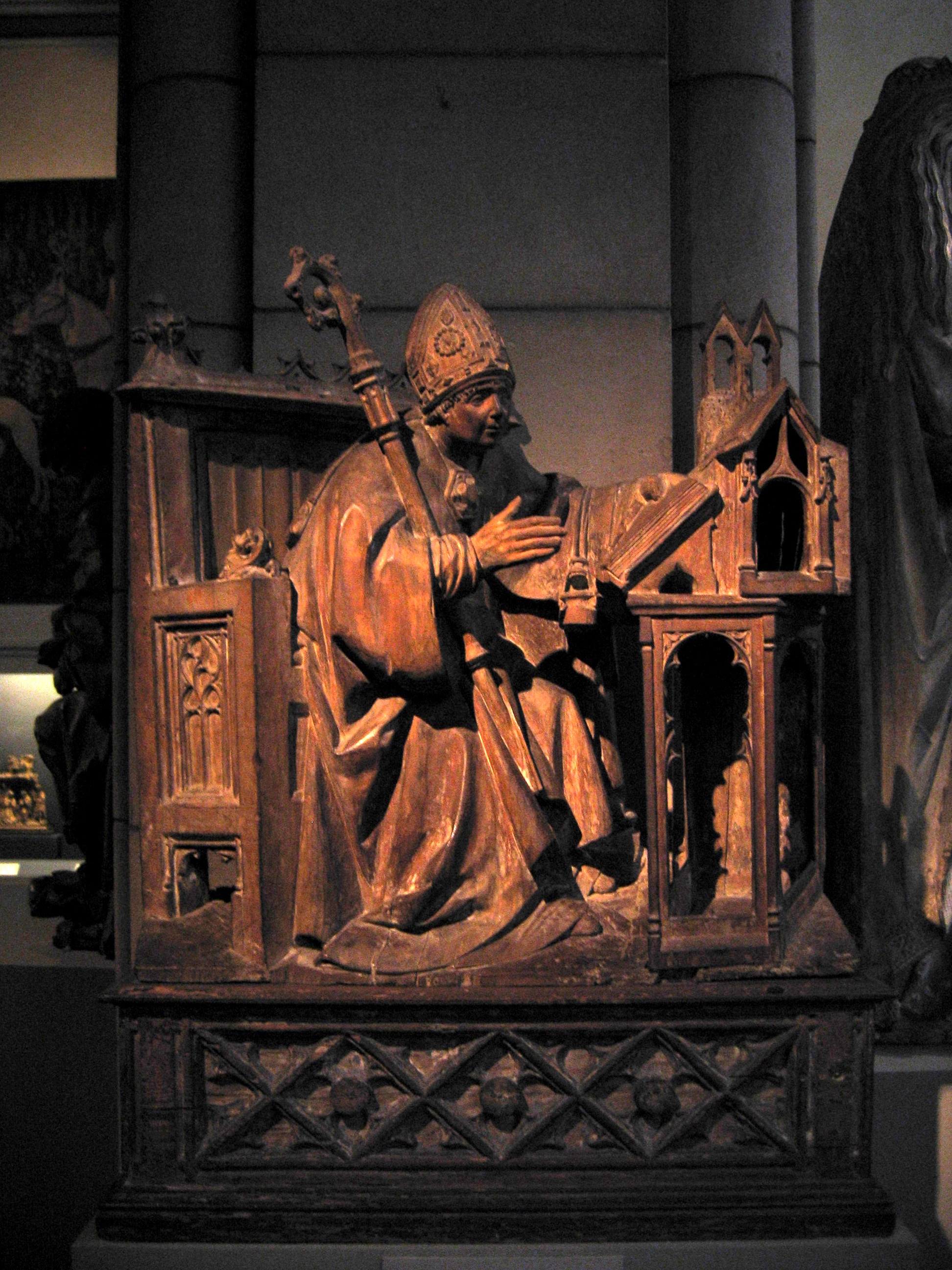
Saint Ambrose in His Study, c. 1500. Spanish, Palencia. Wood with traces of polychromy. Metropolitan Museum of Art, New York City.

Ambrose had the ability to maintain good relationships with all kinds of people. Local church practices varied quite a bit from place to place at this time, and as the bishop, Ambrose could have required that everyone adapt to his way of doing things. It was his place to keep the churches as united as possible in both ritual and belief. Instead, he respected local customs, adapting himself to whatever practices prevailed, instructing his mother to do the same. As bishop, Ambrose undertook many different labours in an effort to unite people and "provide some stability during a period of religious, political, military, and social upheavals and transformations".

Brown says Ambrose "had the makings of a faction fighter". While he got along well with most people, Ambrose was not averse to conflict and even opposed emperors with a fearlessness born of self-confidence and a clear conscience and not from any belief he would not suffer for his decisions. Having begun his life as a Roman aristocrat and a governor, it is clear that Ambrose retained the attitudes and practices of Roman governance even after becoming a bishop.

His acts and writings show he was quite clear about the limits of imperial power over the church's internal affairs including doctrine, moral teaching, and governance. He wrote to Valentinian: "In matters of faith bishops are the judges of Christian emperors, not emperors of bishops." (Epistle 21.4). He also famously said to an Arian bishop chosen by the emperor, "The emperor is in the church, not over the church." (Sermon Against Auxentius, 36). Ambrose's acts and writings "created a sort of model which was to remain valid in the Latin West for the relations of the Church and the Christian State. Both powers stood in a basically positive relationship to each other, but the innermost sphere of the Church's life--faith, the moral order, ecclesiastical discipline--remained withdrawn from the State's influence."

Ambrose was also well aware of the limits of his power. At the height of his career as a venerable, respected and well-loved bishop in 396, imperial agents marched into his church, pushing past him and his clergy who had crowded the altar to protect a political suspect from arrest, and dragged the man from the church in front of Ambrose who could do nothing to stop them. "When it came to the central functions of the Roman state, even the vivid Ambrose was a lightweight".

=== Attitude towards Jews ===
Ambrose is recorded on occasions as taking a hostile attitude towards Jews, for example in 388, when the Emperor Theodosius I was informed that a crowd of Christians had retaliated against the local Jewish community by destroying the synagogue at Callinicum on the Euphrates. The synagogue most probably existed within the fortified town to serve the soldiers stationed there, and Theodosius ordered that the offenders be punished and that the synagogue be rebuilt at the expense of the bishop. Ambrose wrote to the emperor arguing against this, basing his argument on two assertions: first, if the bishop obeyed the order, it would be a betrayal of his faith, and second, if the bishop instead refused to obey the order, he would become a martyr and create a scandal embarrassing the emperor. Ambrose, referring to a prior incident where Magnus Maximus issued an edict censuring Christians in Rome for burning down a Jewish synagogue, warned Theodosius that the people, in turn, exclaimed "the emperor has become a Jew", implying that Theodosius would receive the same lack of support from the people. Theodosius rescinded the order concerning the bishop.

That was not enough for Ambrose, however, and when Theodosius next visited Milan Ambrose confronted him directly in an effort to get him to drop the entire case. McLynn argues that Ambrose failed to win the emperor's sympathy and was mostly excluded from his counsels thereafter. The Callinicum affair was not an isolated incident. Generally speaking, however, while McLynn says it makes Ambrose look like a bully and a bigot to modern eyes, scholars also agree that Ambrose's attitudes toward the Jews cannot be fairly summarized in one sentence, as not all of Ambrose's attitudes toward Jews were negative.

For example, Ambrose makes extensive and appreciative use of the works of a Jew, Philo of Alexandria, in his own writings, treating Philo as one of the "faithful interpreters of the Scriptures". Philo was an educated man of some standing and a prolific writer during the era of Second Temple Judaism. Forty-three of his treatises have been preserved, and these by Christians, rather than Jews. Philo became foundational in forming the Christian literary view on the six days of creation through Basil's Hexaemeron. Eusebius, the Cappadocian Fathers, and Didymus the Blind appropriated material from Philo as well, but none did so more than Ambrose. As a result of these extensive references, Philo was accepted into the Christian tradition as an honorary Church Father. "In fact, one Byzantine catena even refers to him as 'Bishop Philo'. This high regard for Philo even led to a number of legends of his conversion to Christianity, although this assertion stands on very dubious evidence". Ambrose also used Josephus, Maccabees, and other Jewish sources for his writings. He praises some individual Jews. Ambrose tended to write negatively of all non-Nicenes as if they were all in one category. This served a rhetorical purpose in his writing and should be considered accordingly.

=== Attitude towards pagans ===
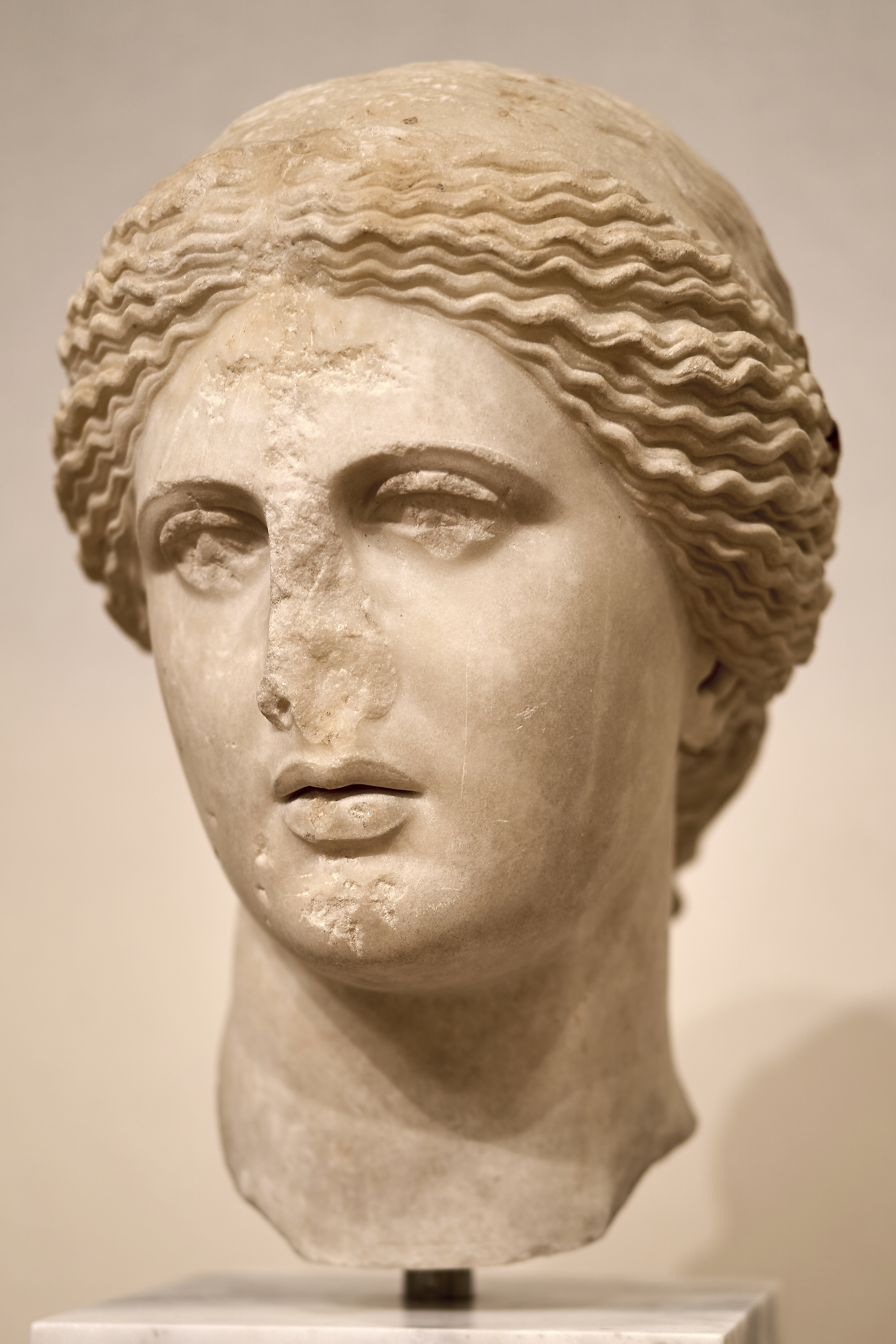
Head of the Greek goddess Aphrodite with a cross carved into its forehead. Ambrose was an influential proponent for the outlawing and destruction of paganism within the Roman Empire.

Modern scholarship indicates that paganism was a lesser concern than heresy for Christians in the fourth and fifth centuries, including Ambrose, but it was still a concern. Writings of this period were commonly hostile and often contemptuous toward paganism which Christianity saw as already defeated in Heaven. The great Christian writers of the third to fifth centuries attempted to discredit the continuation of these "defeated practices" by searching pagan writings, "particularly those of Varro, for everything that could be regarded by Christian standards as repulsive and irreligious." Ambrose' work reflects this triumphalism. (Note: These Christian sources have had great influence on perceptions of this period by creating an impression of overt and continuous conflict that has been assumed on an empire-wide scale, while archaeological evidence indicates that, apart from the use of violent rhetoric, the decline of paganism away from the imperial court was relatively non-confrontational.)

Throughout his time in the episcopate, Ambrose was active in his opposition to any state sponsorship of pagan cults. When Gratian ordered the Altar of Victory to be removed, it roused the aristocracy of Rome to send a delegation to the emperor to appeal against the decision, but Pope Damasus I induced Christian senators to petition against it, and Ambrose blocked the delegates from obtaining an audience with the emperor. Under Valentinian II, an effort was made to restore the Altar of Victory to its ancient station in the hall of the Roman Senate and to again provide support for the seven Vestal Virgins. The pagan party was led by the refined senator Quintus Aurelius Symmachus, who used all his prodigious skill and artistry to create a marvellous document full of the maiestas populi Romani. Hans Lietzmann writes that "Pagans and Christians alike were stirred by the solemn earnestness of an admonition which called all men of goodwill to the aid of a glorious history, to render all worthy honour to a world that was fading away".

Then Ambrose wrote to Valentinian asserting that the emperor was a soldier of God – not simply a personal believer, but one bound by his position to serve the faith; under no circumstances could he agree to something that would promote the worship of idols. (Note: Romans claimed to be the most religious of peoples. Their unique success in war, conquest, and the formation of an empire, was attributed to the empire maintaining good relations with the gods through proper reverence and worship practices. This did not change once the empire's official religion became Christianity.) Ambrose held up the example of Valentinian's brother, Gratian, reminding Valentinian that the commandment of God must take precedence. The bishop's intervention led to the failure of Symmachus' appeal.

In 389, Ambrose stepped in against a pagan senatorial delegation who wished to see the emperor Theodosius I. Although Theodosius refused their requests, he was irritated at the bishop's presumption and refused to see him for several days. Later, Ambrose wrote a letter to the emperor Eugenius complaining that some gifts the latter had bestowed on pagan senators could be used for funding pagan cults.

== Theology ==
Ambrose joins Augustine, Jerome, and Gregory the Great as one of the Latin Doctors of the Church. Theologians compare him with Hilary, who they claim fell short of Ambrose's administrative excellence but demonstrated greater theological ability. He succeeded as a theologian despite his juridical training and his comparatively late handling of biblical and doctrinal subjects.

Ambrose's intense episcopal consciousness furthered the growing doctrine of the Church and its sacerdotal ministry including teaching, leading services, administering sacraments, and giving pastoral advice. He found a proper balance between offering sacraments as mysterious ways of encountering God and sacramentalism, the emphasis on ritual for ritual's sake, prevalent elsewhere. He engaged the prevalent asceticism of the day, continuing the Stoic and Ciceronian training of his youth, which enabled him to promulgate a lofty standard of Christian ethics. Thus he produced the De officiis ministrorum, De viduis, De virginitate and De paenitentia.

Ambrose displayed a kind of liturgical flexibility that kept in mind that liturgy was a tool to serve people in worshiping God, and ought not to become a rigid entity that is invariable from place to place. His advice to Augustine of Hippo on this point was to follow local liturgical custom. "When I am at Rome, I fast on a Saturday; when I am at Milan, I do not. Follow the custom of the church where you are." Thus Ambrose refused to be drawn into a false conflict over which particular local church had the "right" liturgical form where there was no substantial problem. His advice has remained in the English language as the saying, "When in Rome, do as the Romans do."

=== Eschatology ===
Some scholars argue that Ambrose was a Christian universalist. It has been noted that Ambrose's theology was significantly influenced by that of Origen and Didymus the Blind, two other early Christian universalists. One quotation cited in favour of this belief is:

Our Savior has appointed two kinds of resurrection in the Apocalypse. 'Blessed is he that hath part in the first resurrection,' for such come to grace without the judgment. As for those who do not come to the first, but are reserved unto the second resurrection, these shall be disciplined until their appointed times, between the first and the second resurrection.

One could interpret this passage as being another example of the Christian belief in a general resurrection (that both those in Heaven and in Hell undergo a bodily resurrection), or an allusion to purgatory (that some destined for Heaven must first undergo a phase of purification). Some other works by Ambrose could potentially be seen as teaching the mainstream view of salvation. For example:

The Jews feared to believe in manhood taken up into God, and therefore have lost the grace of redemption, because they reject that on which salvation depends.

This could be interpreted as something which is not eschatological but rather rhetorical or conditional on the state of repentance. The passage most often cited in support of Ambrose supposed belief in apokatastasis is his commentary on 1 Corinthians 15, it reads:

A unity of power puts aside all idea of a degrading subjection. His giving up of power, and His victory as conqueror won over death, have not lessened His power. Obedience works out subjection. Christ has taken obedience upon Himself, obedience even to taking on Him our flesh, the cross even to gaining our salvation. Thus where the work lies, there too is the Author of the work. When therefore, all things have become subject to Christ, through Christ's obedience, so that all bend their knees in His name, then He Himself will be all in all. For now, since all do not believe, all do not seem to be in subjection. But when all have believed and done the will of God, then Christ will be all and in all. And when Christ is all and in all, then will God be all and in all; for the Father abides ever in the Son. How, then, is He shown to be weak, Who redeemed the weak?

Other scholars interpret Ambrose's soteriology to be in agreement with Jerome of Stridon and the anonymous individuals whom Augustine criticized in his treatise "on faith and works", who argued that while the unbelievers would experience eternal judgement, all Christians who have believed in Jesus will be reunited to God at some point, even if they have sinned and fallen away.

=== Giving to the poor ===
In De Officiis, the most influential of his surviving works, and one of the most important texts of patristic literature, he reveals his views connecting justice and generosity by asserting these practices are of mutual benefit to the participants. Ambrose draws heavily on Cicero and the biblical book of Genesis for this concept of mutual inter-dependence in society. In the bishop's view, it is concern for one another's interests that binds society together. Ambrose asserts that avarice leads to a breakdown in this mutuality, therefore avarice leads to a breakdown in society itself. In the late 380s, the bishop took the lead in opposing the greed of the elite landowners in Milan by starting a series of pointed sermons directed at his wealthy constituents on the need for the rich to care for the poor.

Some scholars have suggested Ambrose's endeavours to lead his people as both a Roman and a Christian caused him to strive for what a modern context would describe as a type of communism or socialism. He was not just interested in the church but was also interested in the condition of contemporary Italian society. Ambrose considered the poor not a distinct group of outsiders, but a part of a united people to be stood with in solidarity. Giving to the poor was not to be considered an act of generosity towards the fringes of society but a repayment of resources that God had originally bestowed on everyone equally and that the rich had usurped. He defines justice as providing for the poor whom he describes as our "brothers and sisters" because they "share our common humanity".

Pope Leo XIV notes that both Ambrose and Augustine, his adopted protégé, teach that "What you give to the poor is not your property, but theirs".

=== Mariology ===
The theological treatises of Ambrose of Milan would come to influence Popes Damasus, Siricius and Leo XIII. Central to Ambrose is the virginity of Mary and her role as Mother of God.

- The virgin birth is worthy of God. Which human birth would have been more worthy of God, than the one in which the Immaculate Son of God maintained the purity of his immaculate origin while becoming human?
- We confess that Christ the Lord was born from a virgin, and therefore we reject the natural order of things. Because she conceived not from a man but from the Holy Spirit.
- Christ is not divided but one. If we adore him as the Son of God, we do not deny his birth from the virgin. ... But nobody shall extend this to Mary. Mary was the temple of God but not God in the temple. Therefore, only the one who was in the temple can be worshipped.
- Yes, truly blessed for having surpassed the priest (Zechariah). While the priest denied, the Virgin rectified the error. No wonder that the Lord, wishing to rescue the world, began his work with Mary. Thus she, through whom salvation was being prepared for all people, would be the first to receive the promised fruit of salvation.

Ambrose viewed celibacy as superior to marriage and saw Mary as the model of virginity.

=== Augustine ===
Ambrose studied theology with Simplician, a presbyter of Rome. Using his excellent knowledge of Greek, which was then rare in the West, Ambrose studied the Old Testament and Greek authors like Philo, Origen, Athanasius, and Basil of Caesarea, with whom he was also exchanging letters. Ambrose became a famous rhetorician whom Augustine came to hear speak. Augustine wrote in his Confessions that Faustus, the Manichean rhetorician, was a more impressive speaker, but the content of Ambrose's sermons began to affect Augustine's faith. Augustine sought guidance from Ambrose and again records in his Confessions that Ambrose was too busy to answer his questions. In a passage of Augustine's Confessions in which Augustine wonders why he could not share his burden with Ambrose, he comments: "Ambrose himself I esteemed a happy man, as the world counted happiness, because great personages held him in honour. Only his celibacy appeared to me a painful burden." Simplician regularly met with Augustine, however, and Augustine writes of Simplician's "fatherly affection" for him. It was Simplician who introduced Augustine to Christian Neoplatonism. It is commonly understood in the Christian tradition that Ambrose baptized Augustine.

In this same passage of Augustine's Confessions is an anecdote which bears on the history of reading:

When [Ambrose] read, his eyes scanned the page and his heart sought out the meaning, but his voice was silent and his tongue was still. Anyone could approach him freely and guests were not commonly announced, so that often, when we came to visit him, we found him reading like this in silence, for he never read aloud.

This is a celebrated passage in modern scholarly discussion. The practice of reading to oneself without vocalizing the text was less common in antiquity than it has since become. In a culture that set a high value on oratory and public performances of all kinds, in which the production of books was very labour-intensive, the majority of the population was illiterate, and where those with the leisure to enjoy literary works also had slaves to read for them, written texts were more likely to be seen as scripts for recitation than as vehicles of silent reflection. However, there is also evidence that silent reading did occur in antiquity and that it was not generally regarded as unusual.

== Music ==
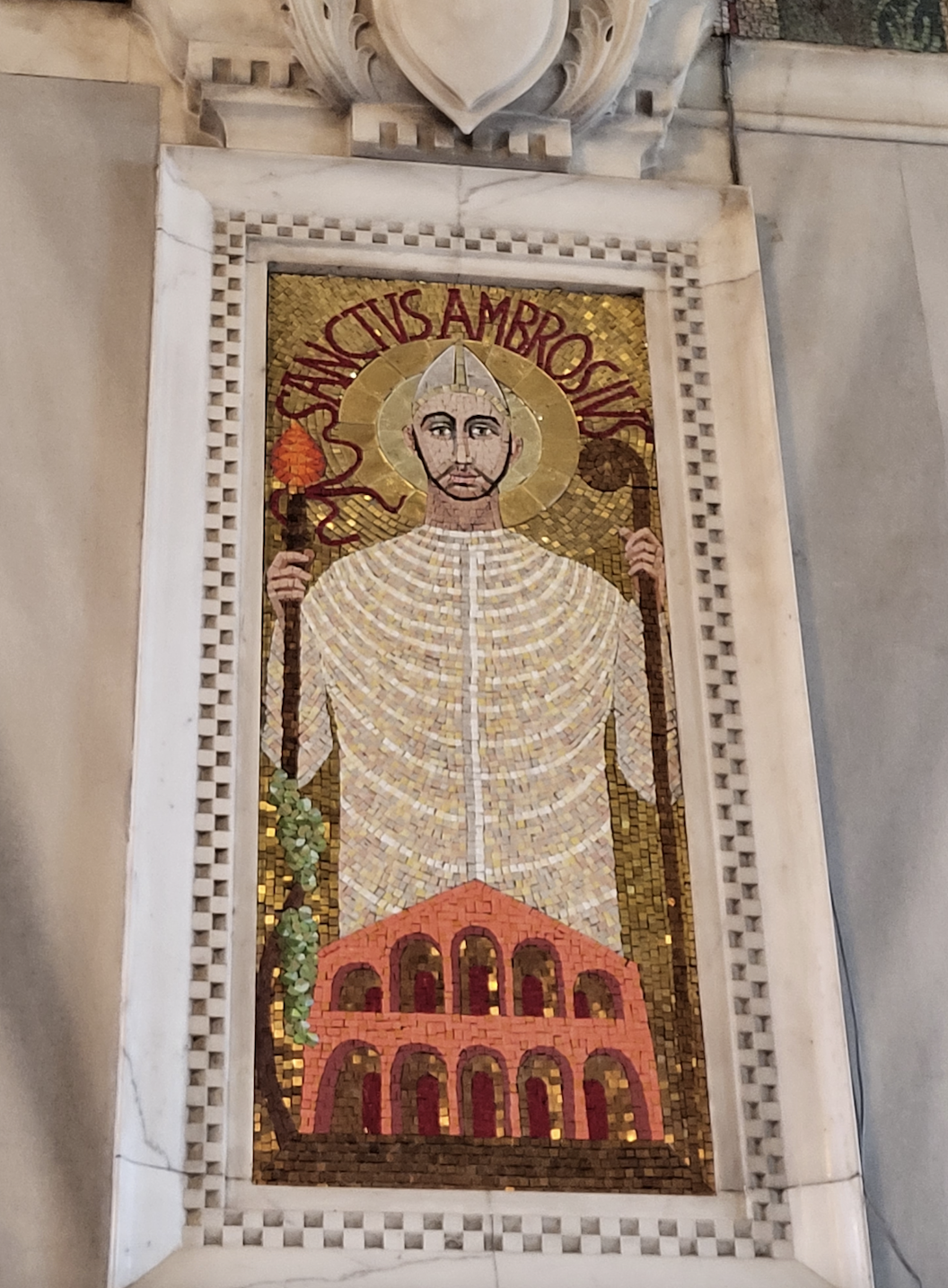
Mosaic of Ambrose in Westminster Cathedral, London

Ambrose's writings extend past literature and into music, where he was an important innovator in early Christian hymnography. His contributions include the "successful invention of Christian Latin hymnody", while the hymnologist Guido Maria Dreves designated him to be "The Father of church hymnody". He was not the first to write Latin hymns; the Bishop Hilary of Poitiers had done so a few decades before. However, the hymns of Hilary are thought to have been largely inaccessible because of their complexity and length. Only fragments of hymns from Hilary's Liber hymnorum exist, making those of Ambrose the earliest extant complete Latin hymns. The assembling of Ambrose's surviving oeuvre remains controversial; the almost immediate popularity of his style quickly prompted imitations, some which may even date from his lifetime. There are four hymns for which Ambrose's authorship is universally accepted, as they are attributed to him by Augustine:

- "Aeterne rerum conditor"
- "Deus creator omnium"
- "Iam surgit hora tertia"
- "Veni redemptor gentium" (also known as "Intende qui regis Israel")

Each of these hymns has eight four-line stanzas and is written in strict iambic tetrameter (that is 4 × 2 syllables, each iamb being two syllables). Marked by dignified simplicity, they served as a fruitful model for later times. Scholars such as the theologian Brian P. Dunkle have argued for the authenticity of as many as thirteen other hymns, while the musicologist James McKinnon contends that further attributions could include "perhaps some ten others". Ambrose is traditionally credited but not actually known to have composed any of the repertory of Ambrosian chant also known simply as "antiphonal chant", a method of chanting where one side of the choir alternately responds to the other. Although Ambrosian chant was named in his honour, no Ambrosian-chant melodies can be attributed to Ambrose. With Augustine, Ambrose was traditionally credited with composing the hymn "Te Deum". Since the hymnologist Guido Maria Dreves in 1893, however, scholars have dismissed this attribution.

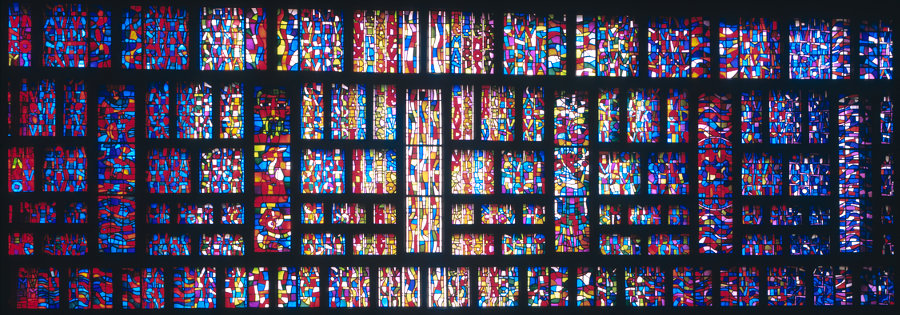
Stained-glass window by Sergio de Castro based on the Ambrosian hymns about the Creation of the universe, Church of the Benedictines at Couvrechef – La Folie (Caen), 1956–1959

== Writings ==
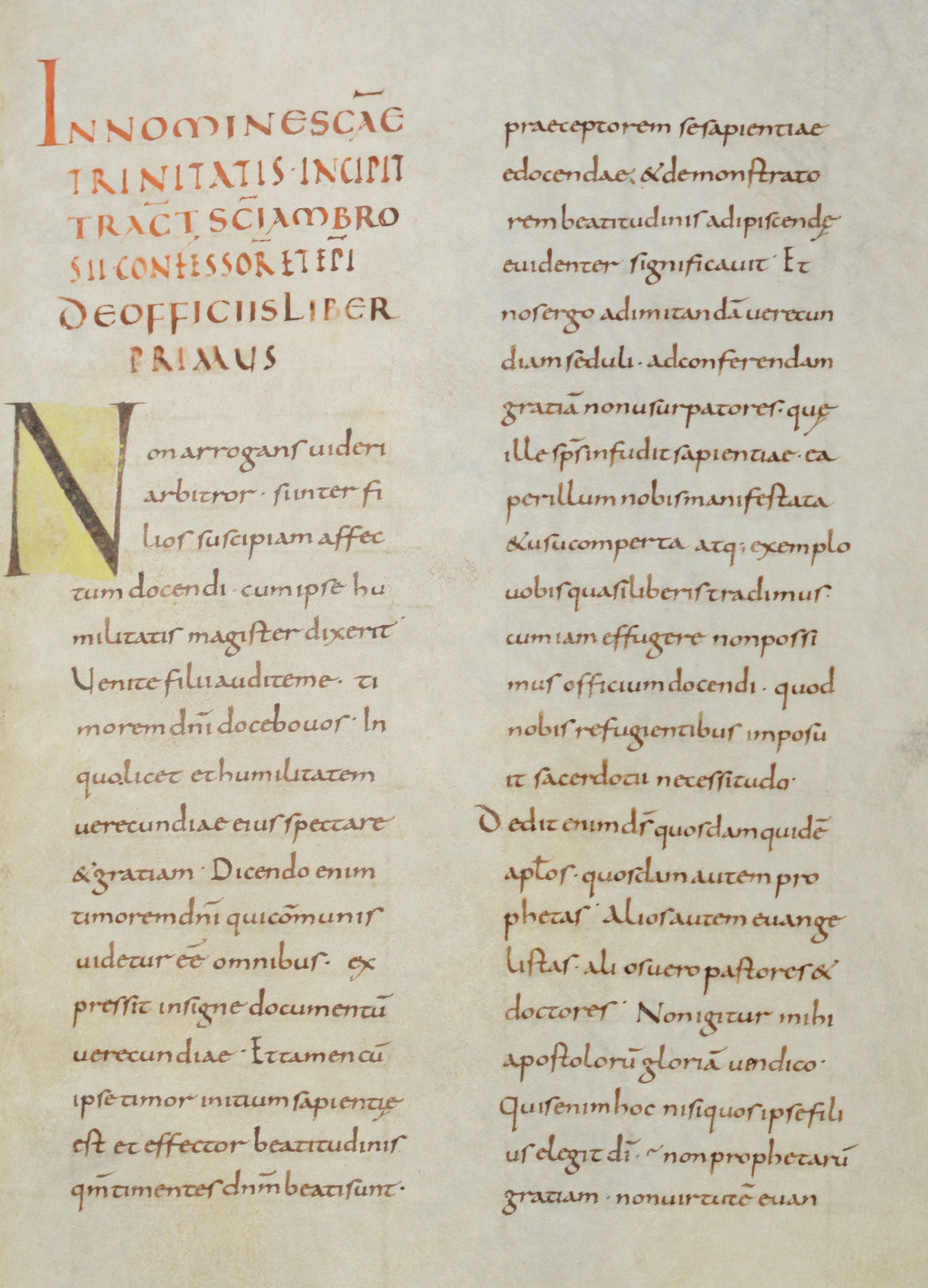
De officiis ministrorum (377–391) in a c. 900 manuscript now kept in the Abbey library of Saint Gall (Cod. Sang. 97 p. 51). The work is probably Ambrose's best known.

Source: All works are originally in Latin. Following each is where it may be found in a standard compilation of Ambrose's writings. His first work was probably De paradiso (377–378). Most have approximate dates, and works such as De Helia et ieiunio (377–391), Expositio evangelii secundum Lucam (377–389) and De officiis ministrorum (377–391) have been given a wide variety of datings by scholars. (Note: Though both Paredi 1964, pp. 436–440 and Ramsey 2002, pp. 55–64 give dates for most of Ambrose's writings, the dates from Ramsey are preferred, as the publication is more recent and the author is dating the works from the perspective of scholarly consensus, whereas in Paredi, the author offers dates based on his own research. Regardless, when Ramsey does not provide dates for a work, those of Paredi are used.) His best known work is probably De officiis ministrorum (377–391), while the Exameron (386–390) and De obitu Theodosii (395) are among his most noted works. In matters of exegesis he is, like Hilary, an Alexandrian. In dogma he follows Basil of Caesarea and other Greek authors, but nevertheless gives a distinctly Western cast to the speculations of which he treats. This is particularly manifest in the weightier emphasis which he lays upon human sin and divine grace, and in the place which he assigns to faith in the individual Christian life. There has been debate on the attribution of some writings: for example De mysteriis is usually attributed to Ambrose, while the related De sacramentis is written in a different style with some silent disagreements, so there is less consensus over its author. This latter work was occasionally identified as being by St. Augustine, though this is erroneous.

=== Exegesis ===
- Exameron [The Six Days of Creation]. Vol. 6 books. 386–390. (PL, 14.133–288; CSEL, 32.1.3–261; FC, 42.3–283)
- De paradiso [On Paradise]. 377–378. (PL, 14.291–332; CSEL, 32.1.265–336; FC, 42.287–356)
- De Cain et Abet [On Cain and Abel]. 377–378. (PL, 14.333–80; CSEL, 32.1.339–409; FC, 42.359–437)
- De Noe [On Noah]. 378–384. (PL, 14.381–438; CSEL, 32.1.413–97)
- De Abraham [On Abraham]. Vol. 2 books. 380s. (PL, 14.441–524; CSEL, 32.1.501–638)
- De Isaac et anima [On Isaac and the Soul]. 387–391. (PL, 14.527–60; CSEL, 32.1.641–700; FC, 65.9–65.)
- De bono mortis [On the Good of Death]. 390. (PL, 14.567–96; CSEL, 32.1.707–53; FC, 65.70–113)
- De fuga saeculi [On Flight from the World]. 391–394. (PL, 14.597–624; CSEL, 32.2.163–207; FC, 65.281–323)
- De Iacob et vita beata [On Iacob and the Happy Life]. 386–388. (PL, 14.627–70; CSEL, 32.2.3–70; FC, 65.119–84)
- De Joseph [On Joseph]. 387–388. (PL, 14.673–704; CSEL, 32.2.73–122; FC, 65.187–237)
- De patriarchis [On the Patriarchs]. 391. (PL, 14.707–28; CSEL, 32.2.125–60; FC, 65.243–75)
- De Helia et ieiunio [On Elijah and Fasting]. 377–391. (PL, 14.731–64; CSEL, 32.2.411–65)
- De Nabuthae [On Naboth]. 389. (CSEL, 32.2.469)
- De Tobia [On Tobias]. 376–390. (PL, 14.797–832; CSEL, 32.2.519–573)
- De interpellatione Iob et David [The Prayer of Job and David]. Vol. 4 books. 383–394. (PL, 14.835–90; CSEL, 32.2.211–96; FC, 65.329–420)
- Apologia prophetae David [A Defense of the Prophet David]. 387. (PL, 14.891–926; CSEL, 32.2.299–355)
- Enarrationes in xii psalmos davidicos [Explanations of Twelve Psalms of David]. (PL, 14.963–1238; CSEL, 64)
- Expositio in Psalmum cxviii [A Commentary on Psalm 118]. 386–390. (PL, 15.1197–1526; CSEL, 62)
- Expositio Esaiae prophetae [A Commentary on the Prophet Isaiah]. (CCSL, 14.405–8)
- Expositio evangelii secundum Lucam [A Commentary on the Gospel according to Luke]. Vol. 10 books. 377–389. (PL, 15.1527–1850; CSEL, 32.4; CCSL, 14.1–400)

=== Moral and ascetical commentary ===
- De officiis ministrorum [On the Duties of Ministers]. 377–391. (PL, 16.25–194)
- De virginibus [On Virgins]. 377.
- De viduis [On Widows]. 377. (PL, 16.247–76)
- De virginitate [On Virginity]. 378. (PL, 16.279–316)
- De institutione virginis [An Instruction for a Virgin]. 391–392. (PL, 16.319–43)
- Exhortatio virginitatis [In Praise of Virginity]. 393–395. (PL, 16.351–80)

=== Dogmatic writings ===
- De fide [On the Faith]. Vol. 5 books. 378–380. (PL, 16.549–726; CSEL, 78)
- De Spiritu Sancto [On the Holy Spirit]. 381. (PL, 16.731–850; CSEL, 79.15–222; FC, 44.35–214)
- De incarnationis dominicae sacramento [On the Sacrament of the Lord's Incarnation]. 381–382. (PL, 16.853–84; CSEL, 79.223–81; FC, 44.219–62)
- Explanatio symboli ad initiandos [An Explanation of the Creed for Those about to be Baptised]. PL, 17.1193–96; CSEL, 73.1–12)
- De sacramentis [On the Sacraments]. Vol. 6 books. 390. (PL, 16.435–82; CSEL, 73.13–116; FC, 44.269–328)
- De mysteriis [On the Mysteries].
- De paenitentia [On Repentance]. 384–394. (PL, 16.485–546; CSEL, 73.117–206)
- Expositio fidei [An Explanation of the Faith]. (PL, 16.847–50)
- De sacramento regenerationis sive de philosophia [On the Sacrament of Regeneration, or On Philosophy]. (fragmented; CSEL, 11.131)

=== Sermons ===
- De excessu fratris [On the Death of his Brother]. 375–378. (PL, 16.1345–1414; CSEL, 73.207–325; FC, 22.161–259)
- De obitu Valentiniani [On the Death of Valentinian]. (PL, 16.1417–44; CSEL, 73.327–67; FC, 22.265–99)
- De obitu Theodosii [On the Death of Theodosius]. 25 February 395. (PL, 16.1447–88; CSEL, 73.369–401; FC, 22.307–332)
- Contra Auxentium de basilicis tradendis [Against Auxentius on Handing over the Basilicas]. 386. (PL, 16.1049–53)

=== Others ===
- 91 letters

== Editions ==
Divi Ambrosii Episcopi Mediolanensis Omnia Opera, a 1527 edition of Ambrose's writings compiled and edited by Erasmus

The history of the editions of St. Ambrose's works spans several centuries. Erasmus published them in four volumes in Basel in 1527. A significant Roman edition, the result of many years of labor, appeared in 1580 in five volumes, initiated by Sixtus V when he was still the monk Felice Peretti. This edition includes a biography of St. Ambrose by Baronius, originally written to be part of his Annales Ecclesiastici. The notable Maurist edition, edited by Jacques Du Frische and Denis-Nicolas Le Nourry, was published in Paris between 1686 and 1690 in two folio volumes and was later reprinted in Venice in 1748–51 and 1781–82. The most recent edition, by Paolo Angelo Ballerini, was published in Milan in 1878 in six folio volumes.

=== Standard editions ===
- Migne, Jacques Paul, ed. (1845). Patrologia Latina (in Latin). Vol. 14–17. Paris. Based on the Maurist edition published in Paris by Jacques Du Frische and Denis-Nicolas Le Nourry.
- Corpus Scriptorum Ecclesiasticorum Latinorum (in Latin). Vol. 11, 32, 62, 64, 73, 78–79. Vienna: Imperial Academy of Sciences in Vienna. 1866.
- Ballerini, P. A., ed. (1875–1883). Opera omnia (in Latin). Milan. Based on the Maurist edition published in Paris by Jacques Du Frische and Denis-Nicolas Le Nourry.
- Catholic University of America, ed. (1947). Fathers of the Church. Vol. 22, 42, 44, 65. Washington DC.: Catholic University of America Press. OCLC 8110481.
- Corpus Christianorum. Vol. 14. Turnhout: Brepols. 1953. OCLC 1565173.

=== Latin ===
- Hexameron, De paradiso, De Cain, De Noe, De Abraham, De Isaac, De bono mortis – ed. C. Schenkl 1896, Vol. 32/1 (In Latin)
- De Iacob, De Ioseph, De patriarchis, De fuga saeculi, De interpellatione Iob et David, De apologia prophetae David, De Helia, De Nabuthae, De Tobia – ed. C. Schenkl 1897, Vol. 32/2
- Expositio evangelii secundum Lucam – ed. C. Schenkl 1902, Vol. 32/4
- Expositio de psalmo CXVIII – ed. M. Petschenig 1913, Vol. 62; editio altera supplementis aucta – cur. M. Zelzer 1999
- Explanatio super psalmos XII – ed. M. Petschenig 1919, Vol. 64; editio altera supplementis aucta – cur. M. Zelzer 1999
- Explanatio symboli, De sacramentis, De mysteriis, De paenitentia, De excessu fratris Satyri, De obitu Valentiniani, De obitu Theodosii – ed. Otto Faller 1955, Vol. 73
- De fide ad Gratianum Augustum – ed. Otto Faller 1962, Vol. 78
- De spiritu sancto, De incarnationis dominicae sacramento – ed. Otto Faller 1964, Vol. 79
- Epistulae et acta – ed. Otto Faller (Vol. 82/1: lib. 1–6, 1968); Otto Faller, M. Zelzer (Vol. 82/2: lib. 7–9, 1982); M. Zelzer (Vol. 82/3: lib. 10, epp. extra collectionem. gesta concilii Aquileiensis, 1990); Indices et addenda – comp. M. Zelzer, 1996, Vol. 82/4

=== English ===
- H. Wace and P. Schaff, eds, A Select Library of Nicene and Post–Nicene Fathers of the Christian Church, 2nd ser., Vol. X [Contains translations of De Officiis (under the title De Officiis Ministrorum), De Spiritu Sancto (On the Holy Spirit), De excessu fratris Satyri (On the Decease of His Brother Satyrus), Exposition of the Christian Faith, De mysteriis (Concerning Mysteries), De paenitentia (Concerning Repentance), De virginibus (Concerning Virgins), De viduis (Concerning Widows), and a selection of letters]
- St. Ambrose "On the mysteries" and the treatise on the sacraments by an unknown author, translated by T Thompson, (London: SPCK, 1919) [translations of De sacramentis and De mysteriis; rev edn published 1950]
- S. Ambrosii De Nabuthae: a commentary, translated by Martin McGuire, (Washington, DC: The Catholic University of America, 1927) [translation of On Naboth]
- S. Ambrosii De Helia et ieiunio: a commentary, with an introduction and translation, Sister Mary Joseph Aloysius Buck, (Washington, DC: The Catholic University of America, 1929) [translation of On Elijah and Fasting]
- S. Ambrosii De Tobia: a commentary, with an introduction and translation, Lois Miles Zucker, (Washington, DC: The Catholic University of America, 1933) [translation of On Tobit]
- Funeral orations, translated by LP McCauley et al., Fathers of the Church vol 22, (New York: Fathers of the Church, Inc., 1953) [by Gregory of Nazianzus and Ambrose],
- Letters, translated by Mary Melchior Beyenka, Fathers of the Church, vol 26, (Washington, DC: Catholic University of America, 1954) [Translation of letters 1–91]
- Saint Ambrose on the sacraments, edited by Henry Chadwick, Studies in Eucharistic faith and practice 5, (London: AR Mowbray, 1960)
- Hexameron, Paradise, and Cain and Abel, translated by John J Savage, Fathers of the Church, vol 42, (New York: Fathers of the Church, 1961) [contains translations of Hexameron, De paradise, and De Cain et Abel]
- Saint Ambrose: theological and dogmatic works, translated by Roy J. Deferrari, Fathers of the church vol 44, (Washington: Catholic University of American Press, 1963) [Contains translations of The mysteries, (De mysteriis) The holy spirit, (De Spiritu Sancto), The sacrament of the incarnation of Our Lord, (De incarnationis Dominicae sacramento), and The sacraments]
- Seven exegetical works, translated by Michael McHugh, Fathers of the Church, vol 65, (Washington: Catholic University of America Press, 1972) [Contains translations of Isaac, or the soul, (De Isaac vel anima), Death as a good, (De bono mortis), Jacob and the happy life, (De Iacob et vita beata), Joseph, (De Ioseph), The patriarchs, (De patriarchis), Flight from the world, (De fuga saeculi), The prayer of Job and David, (De interpellatione Iob et David).]
- Homilies of Saint Ambrose on Psalm 118, translated by Íde Ní Riain, (Dublin: Halcyon Press, 1998) [translation of part of Explanatio psalmorum]
- Ambrosian hymns, translated by Charles Kraszewski, (Lehman, PA: Libella Veritatis, 1999)
- Commentary of Saint Ambrose on twelve psalms, translated by Íde M. Ní Riain, (Dublin: Halcyon Press, 2000) [translations of Explanatio psalmorum on Psalms 1, 35–40, 43, 45, 47–49]
- On Abraham, translated by Theodosia Tomkinson, (Etna, CA: Center for Traditionalist Orthodox Studies, 2000) [translation of De Abraham]
- De officiis, edited with an introduction, translation, and commentary by Ivor J Davidson, 2 vols, (Oxford: OUP, 2001) [contains both Latin and English text]
- Commentary of Saint Ambrose on the Gospel according to Saint Luke, translated by Íde M. Ní Riain, (Dublin: Halcyon, 2001) [translation of Expositio evangelii secundum Lucam]
- Ambrose of Milan: political letters and speeches, translated with an introduction and notes by JHWG Liebschuetz, (Liverpool: Liverpool University Press, 2005) [contains Book Ten of Ambrose's Letters, including the oration on the death of Theodosius I; Letters outside the Collection (Epistulae extra collectionem); Letter 30 to Magnus Maximus; The oration on the death of Valentinian II (De obitu Valentiniani).]

Several of Ambrose's works have recently been published in the bilingual Latin-German Fontes Christiani series (currently edited by Brepols).

== See also ==
- Ambrosian hymnography
- Ambrosian Liturgy and Rite
- Saint Ambrose Basilica, Milan
- Church Fathers
- St. Ambrose Cathedral, Linares
- Saint Ambrose University, Davenport, Iowa
- Ambrose University College, Calgary, Alberta
- Henry Becher, early English translator of St. Ambrose

Catholic Church titles
Preceded by Auxentius	Archbishop of Milan; 374–397	Succeeded by Simplician
