= Denis-Nicolas Le Nourry =

Denis-Nicolas Le Nourry (18 February 1647 – 24 March 1724) was a French Benedictine scholar of the Congregation of St-Maur, an ecclesiastical writer.

== Life ==
Le Nourry was born at Dieppe in Normandy. He received his first education from the priests of the Oratory at Dieppe; then entered the Benedictine Order at Jumièges, 8 July 1665. After completing his theological studies and being ordained to the priesthood, he was sent to Rouen, and the Abbey of Bonnenouvelle. He died at the Abbey of St-Germain in Paris.

== Works ==
He assisted Jean Garet in publishing the writings of Cassiodorus (1679). For this he wrote the preface and the life of the author.

In the edition of the works of Ambrose he aided Jean du Chesne and Julien Bellaise at Rouen, and later Jacques Du Frische at Paris, where he spent the last forty years of his life. His major work is the "Apparatus ad bibliothecam maximam veterum patrum et antiquorum scriptorum", published at Paris in two volumes (1703 and 1715) as an aid to the study of the Lyon collection of the Church Fathers. In extensive dissertations he gives the biography of each writer; the occasion, design, scope, and genuineness of every writing; a history of the time in which the author lived; its dogmatical and moral tendency, and its struggles against heathenism or heresies. The work was well received.

In 1710 he edited the "Liber ad Donatum confessorem de mortibus persecutorum", and in a special dissertation tries hard to prove that the book was written by Lucius Caecilius and not by Lactantius. Besides these he edited the "Epitome institutionum divinarum" of Lactantius, the "Expositum de die paschae et mensis" of Quintus Julius Hilarianus, and a fragment of "De origine generis humani".
