= Vuolvino =

Italian monk and goldsmith (fl. 9th century)

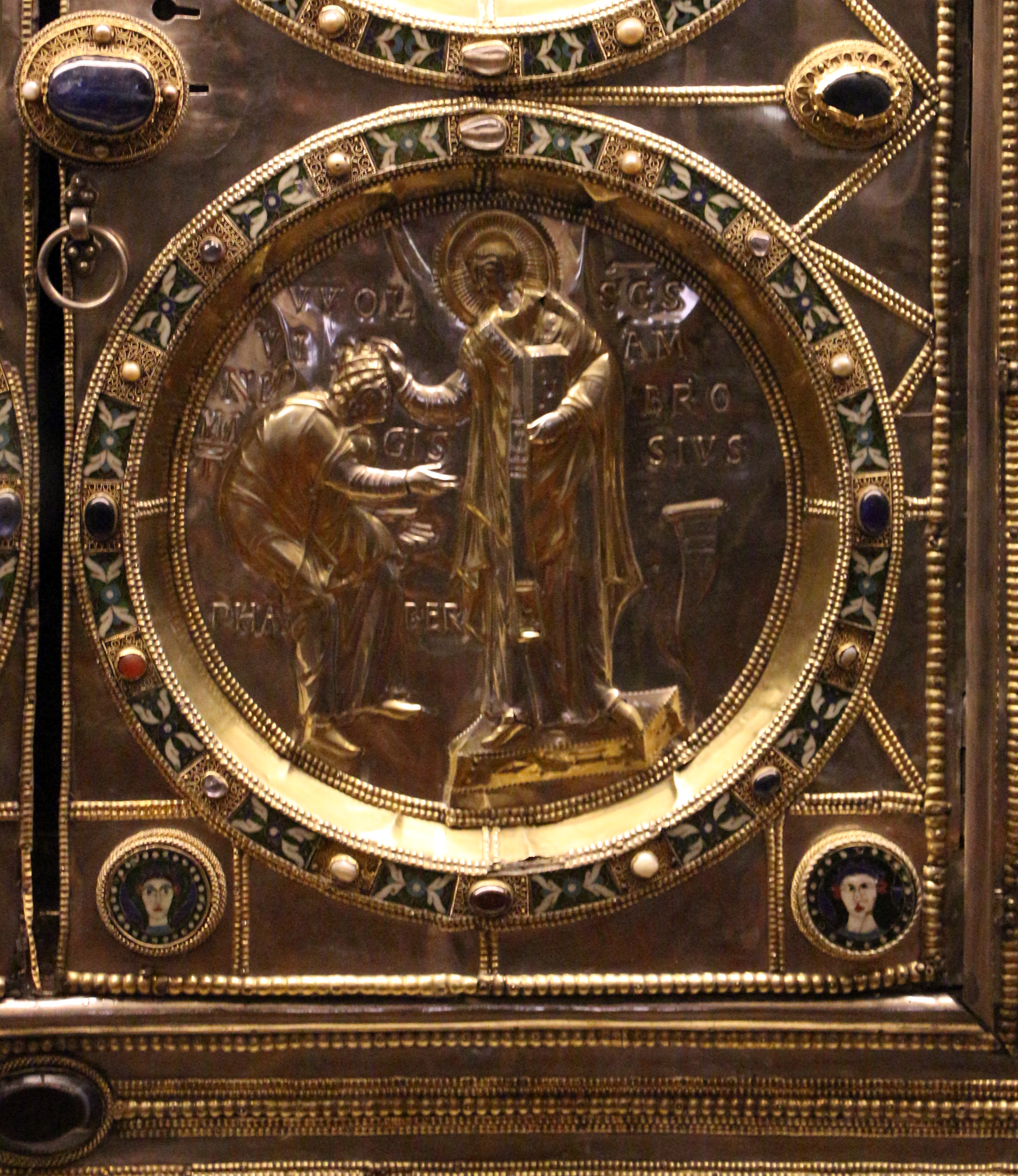
Ambrose crowning Vuolvino, from the Altar of Sant'Ambrogio

Vuolvino (fl. 9th century), alternatively known as Volvinio or Magister phaber Volvinius (in Latin), was an Italian monk and goldsmith, best known for the creation of the Altar of Sant'Ambrogio in the Basilica of Sant'Ambrogio in Milan. He is one of the earliest examples of an Italian artist leaving their signature on their work.
