= Henry Becher =

Translator and vicar

Henry Becher (fl. 1561) was an English translator and vicar of Mayfield, in the jurisdiction of South Malling. He translated into the English tongue and adorned with a long preface against the late Pelagians – i.e. Henry Hart and others in Kent, Essex, London, and other places – the two books of St. Ambrose de Vocatione Gentium. In the preface are many things concerning this heresy which was active in many parts of England in the times of Henry VIII and Queen Mary. The full title of his translation is as follows: Two Books of Saint Ambrose, Bysshoppe of Mytleyne, entituled Of the Vocation and Calling of all Nations: newly translated out of Latin into Englyshe, for the edifying and comfort of the single-mynded and godly, unlearned in Christes Church, agaynst the late stronge secte of the Pelagians, the maynteyners of the free wyll of men, and denyers of the grace of God, London, 1561, octavo. (Note: manuscript Coll. Corp. Chr. Cantabr. Miscell.) (Note: Tanner's Bibl. British-Hibern. page 82) (Note: Watt's Bibl. British)
