= Basilica of Sant'Ambrogio =

Romanesque church in Milan

Coordinates: 45°27′44.73″N 9°10′32.90″E

- Basilica di Sant'Ambrogio; Basilega de Sant Ambroeus
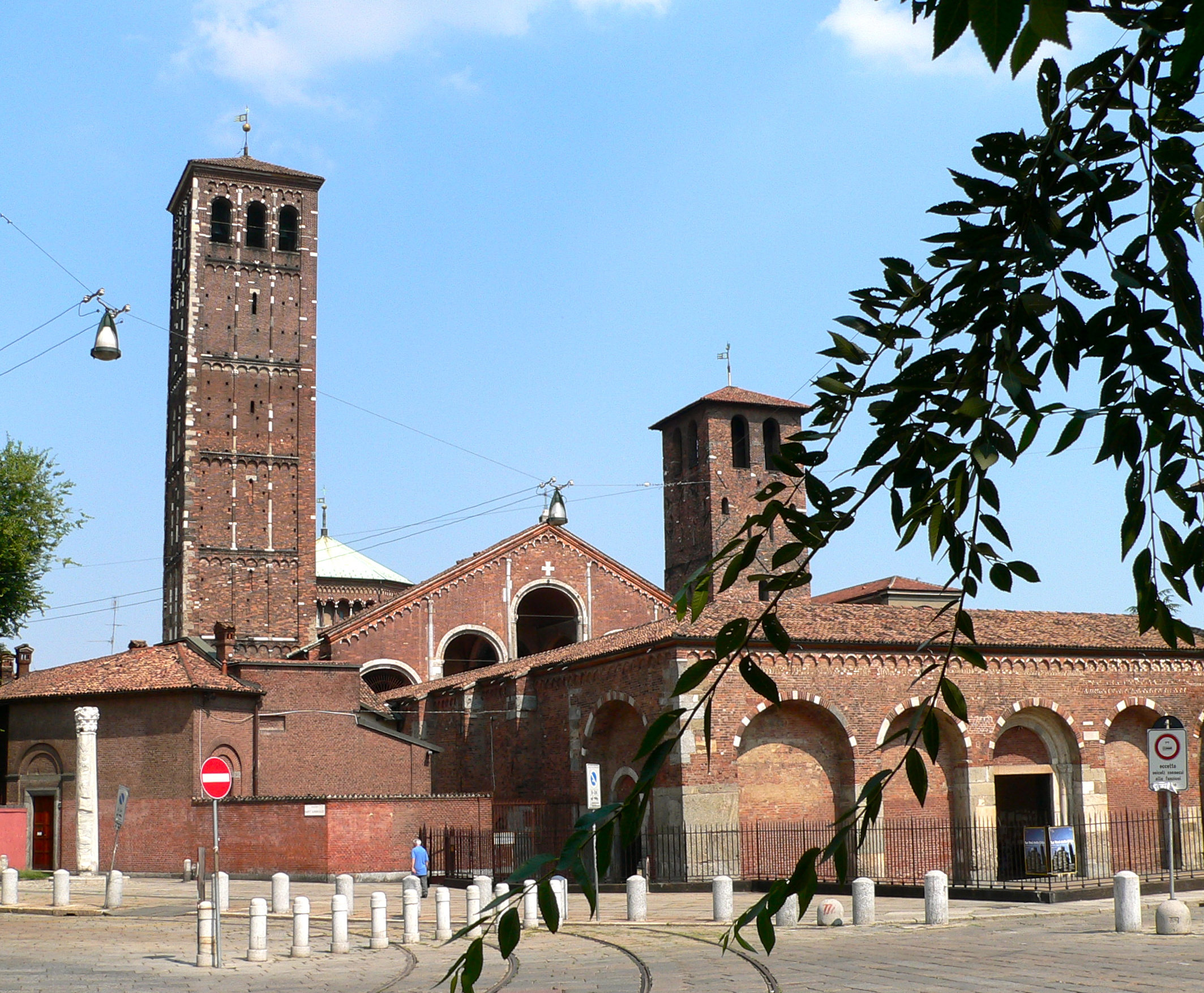
- Exterior view of the Basilica

Religion
- Affiliation: Catholic
- Diocese: Milan
- Province: Milan
- Ecclesiastical or organisational status: Minor basilica
- Year consecrated: 379
- Status: Active

Location
- Location: Milan, Italy
- Interactive map of Basilica of Sant'Ambrogio

Architecture
- Type: Church
- Style: Romanesque
- Completed: 1099

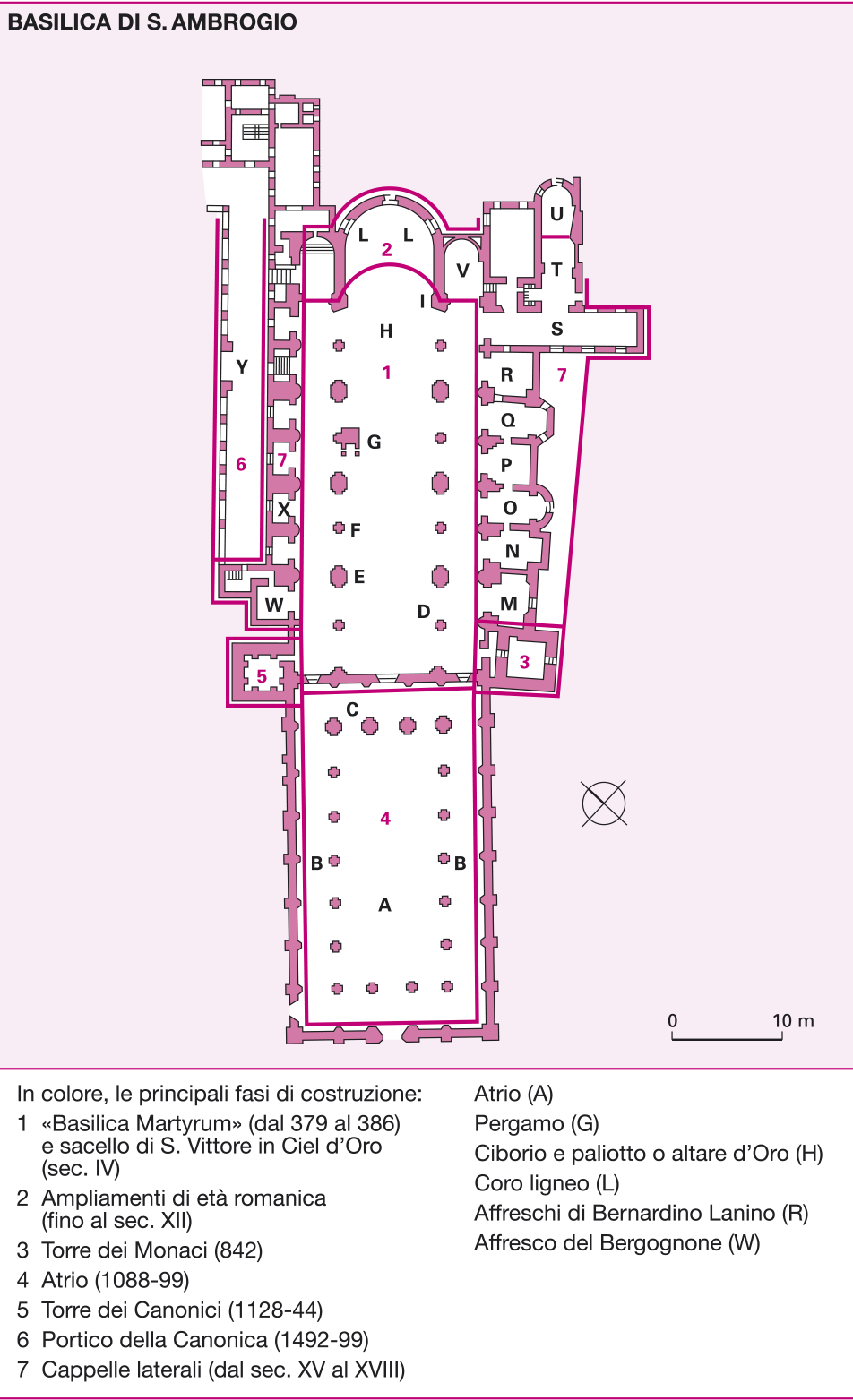
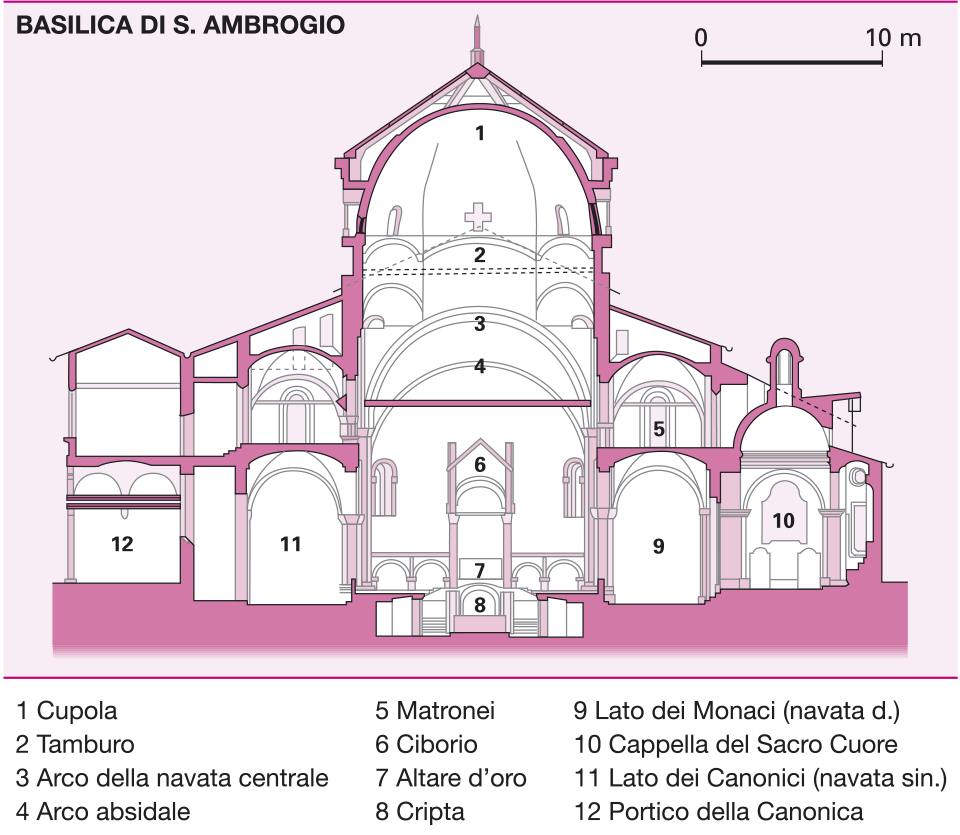
Plan and section of the Basilica

The Basilica of Sant'Ambrogio, officially known as Basilica romana minore collegiata abbaziale prepositurale di Sant'Ambrogio (Milanese: Basilega romana menor collegiada abbaziala prepositulara de Sant Ambroeus), is an ancient Romanesque-style, Roman Catholic church located in the center of Milan, in the region of Lombardy, Italy.

== History ==
One of the most ancient churches in Milan, it was commissioned by St. Ambrose in 379–386, in an area where numerous martyrs of the Roman persecutions had been buried. The first name of the church was in fact Basilica Martyrum.

When St Ambrose arrived in Milan to assume the bishopric, churches in the region were in conflict with each other over the dispute between Arianism and the Nicene Creed as well as numerous local issues. Ambrose firmly sided with the Nicene partisans, and wanted northern Italy to remain allied to the papacy. He did this through both preaching and construction. He built three or four churches surrounding the city; Basilica Apostolorum (now San Nazaro in Brolo), Basilica Virginum (now San Simpliciano), and Basilica Martyrum (which was later renamed in his honour). A fourth church, Basilica Salvatoris (later San Dionigi, razed in the 17th century), is attributed to him as well, but may not actually be from the 4th century. These churches were dedicated with anti-Arian language and as symbols of the wealth and power of the pro-Nicene faction in Milan.

The church building has undergone several restorations and partial reconstructions, assuming the current appearance in the 12th century, when it was rebuilt in the Romanesque style. Initially, the basilica was outside the Roman city walls of Milan, but over the following centuries, the city grew up around it. It became a centre of religious life and a community of canons developed in the church. In 789, a monastery was established within the basilica grounds. The canons, however, retained their own community and identity instead of fading away. Two separate, distinct religious communities shared the basilica. In the 11th century, the canons adopted a rule of life and became Canons Regular. There were now two separate monastic communities following different rules living in the basilica. The canons were in the northern building, the cloister of the canons, while the monks were in the two southern buildings.

The two towers symbolize the division in the basilica. The 9th-century Torre dei Monaci ("Tower of the Monks") was used by the monks to call the faithful to the monks' Mass. The monks supported themselves partly from the offerings given after Mass. However, the canons did not have a bell tower and were not allowed to ring bells until they finished their own tower (on the north side) in the 12th century.

The monastery and church became a large landholder in northern Italy and into what is now the Swiss Canton of Ticino. On 4 August 1528, an accord known as the "Peace of St. Ambrose" was signed here between the noble and popular factions of the city. In 1492 the Benedictines commissioned Donato Bramante, structural architect of St. Peter's Basilica, to renovate the new rectory.

In August 1943, the Allied bombings heavily damaged the basilica, in particular the apse and surrounding area. As a result of this a new building, painted in pink, was constructed to house the Abbot's offices and the museum.

== Description ==
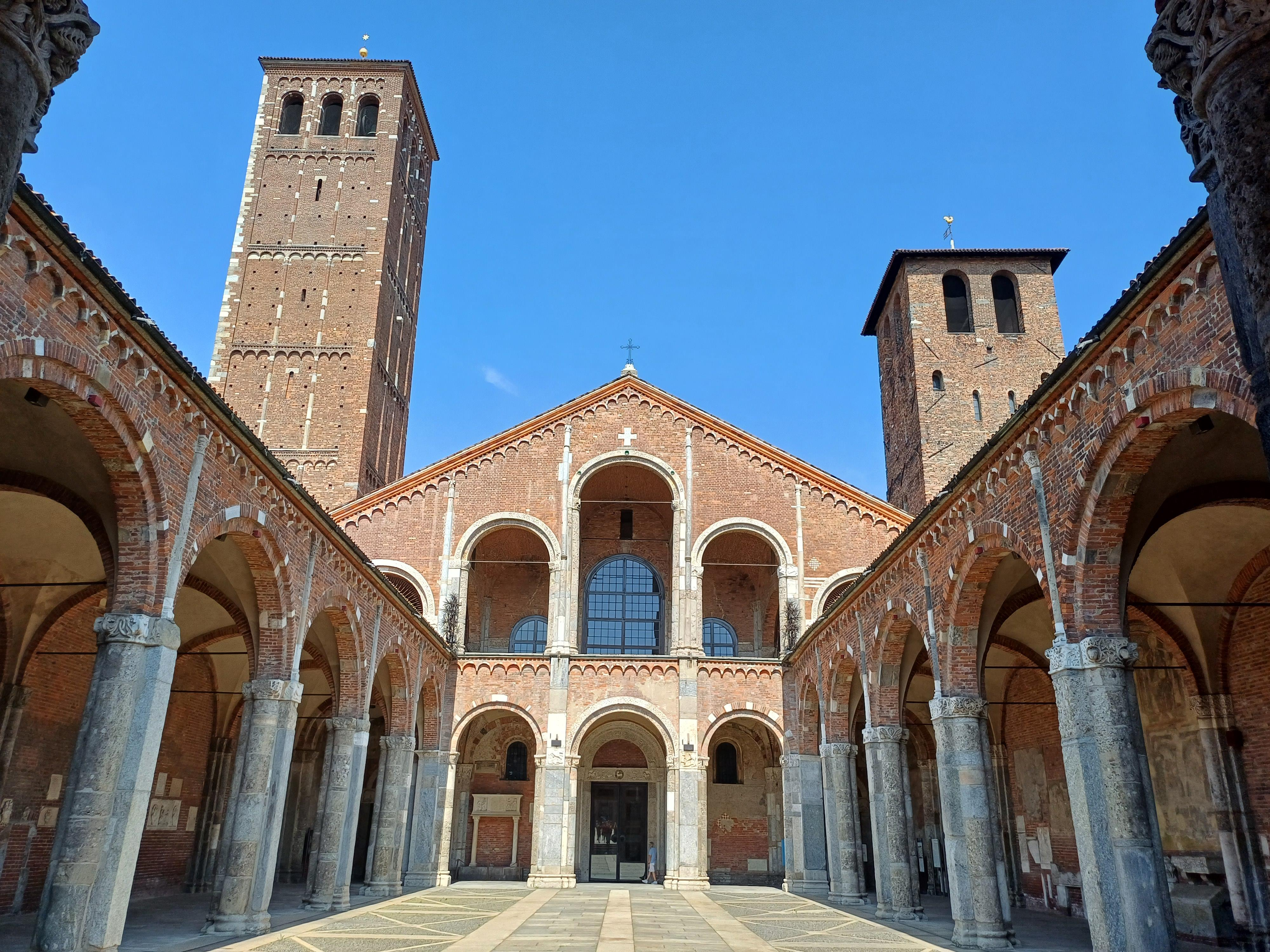
The apex façade with the entrance portico

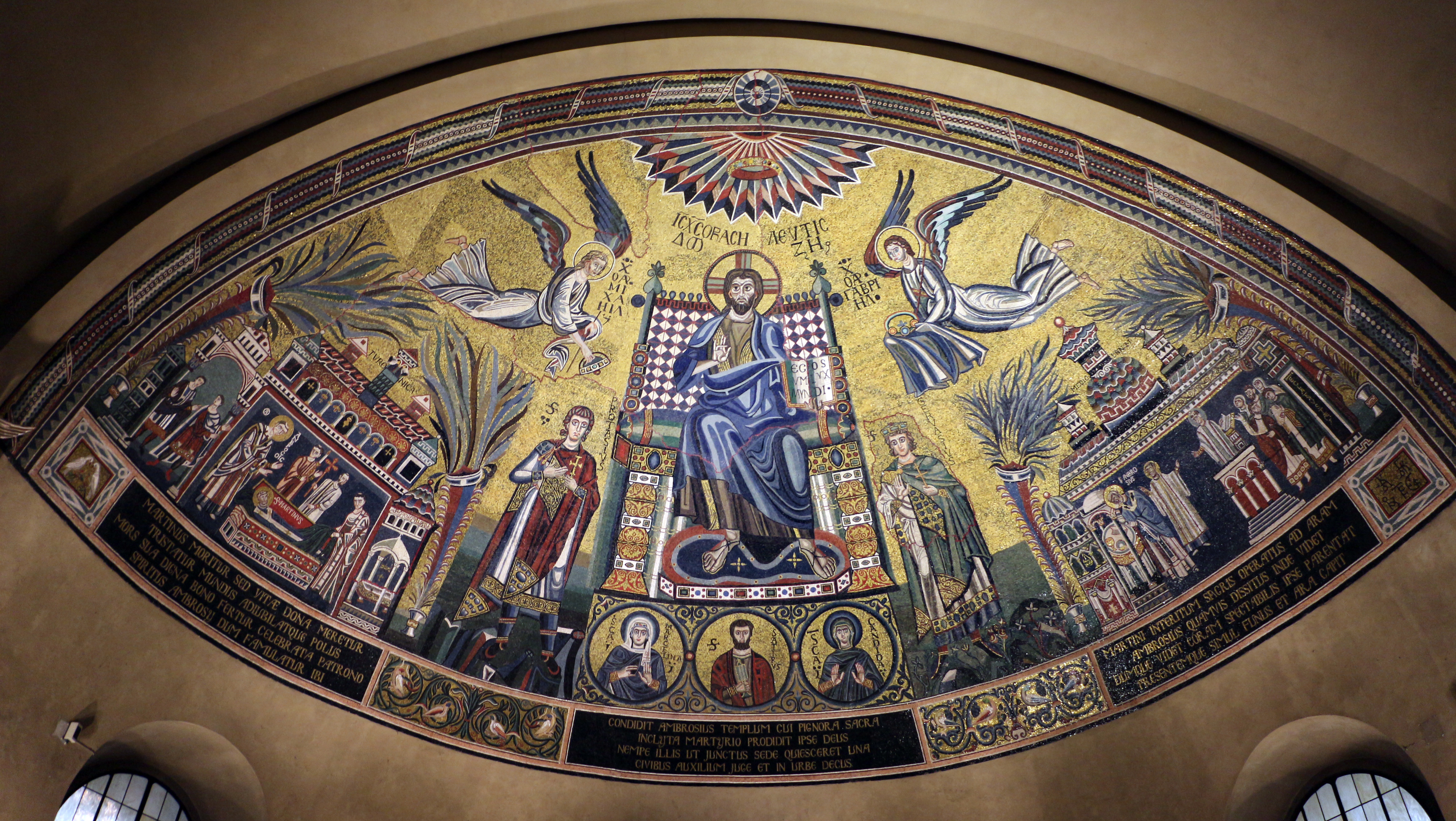
Mosaic of Christ Pantocrator from the 4th to 8th century (with later restoration)

The church is mostly built in brickwork of different origins and colours, with parts of stone and white plastering. The current Romanesque church was begun around 1080. The nave dates to about 1128, and the rib vaults of the nave are from about 1140.

The original edifice, like the great churches of Rome of the same epoch, belonged to the basilica type; it consisted of a central nave lighted from the clerestory, two side aisles, an apse, and an atrium. Investigations made in 1864 have established the fact that the nave and the aisles of the existing basilica correspond with those of the primitive church; the atrium, however, which dates from the 9th century, and two smaller apses, flanking a new central apse of greater depth than the original, was erected. The altar occupies about the same place as in the time of St. Ambrose, and the columns of the ciborium over the altar appear never to have been disturbed; they still rest on the original pavement.

In the following centuries, the edifice underwent several restorations and partial reconstructions, assuming the current appearance in the 12th century. The original basilica plan was maintained, with an apse and two aisles, all with apses, and a portico with arches supported by semi-columns and pilasters preceding the entrance. The latter was used to house the catechumens who attended part of the Mass prior to receiving baptism (this custom disappeared in the early 11th century); the portico, whose entrance has four blind arcades with an open one in the centre, was later used for civil and religious meetings.

=== Exterior ===
The apex of the façade has two orders of loggias: the lower register has three arches of the same span, which join the slightly higher portico ones. The upper loggia was used by the bishops to bless the citizens.

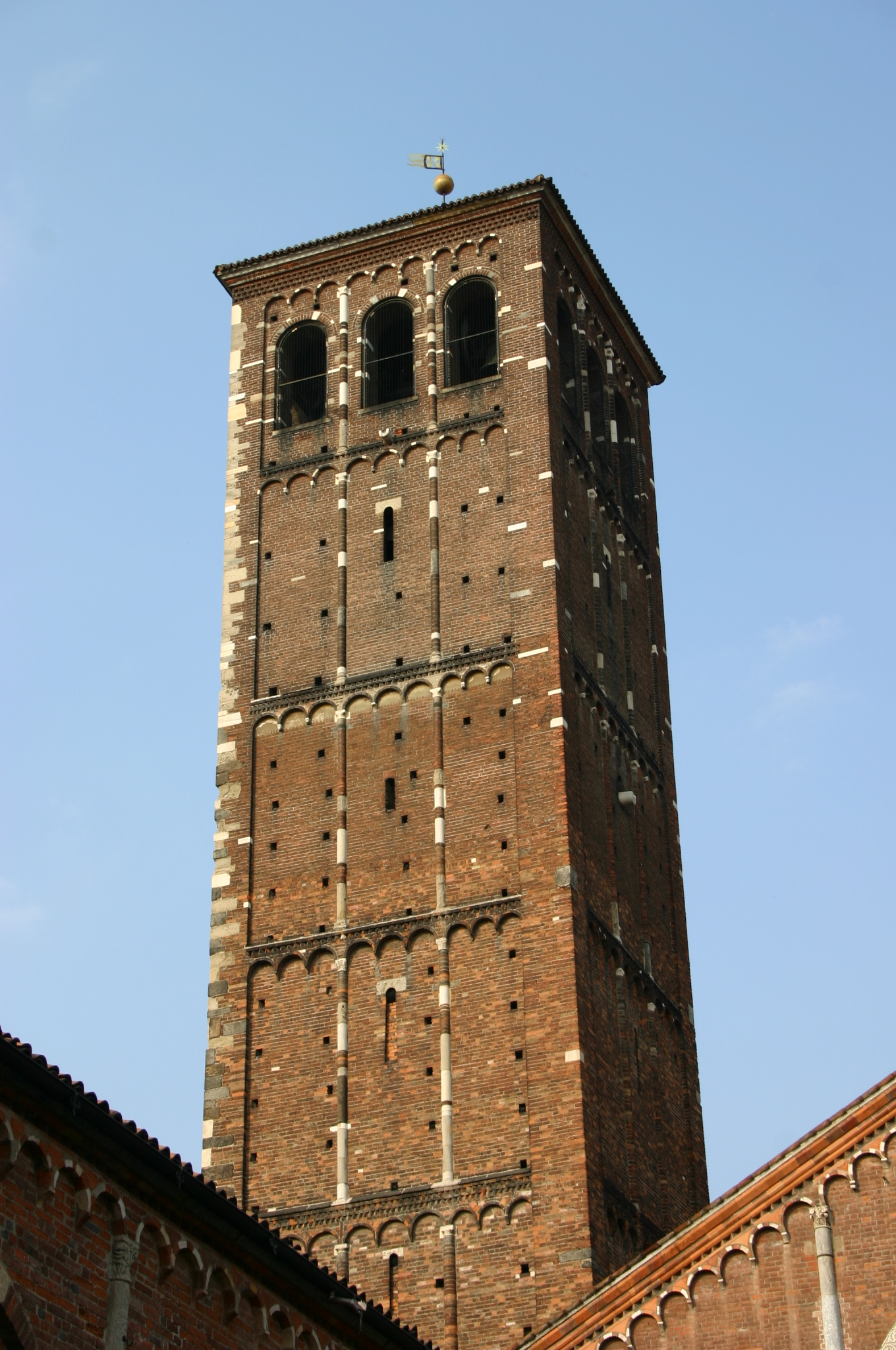
The Canons' bell tower

The portico's arcade is supported by pillars flanked by semi-columns. They have double archivolts, while the portico's upper frame is decorated with Lombard bands, which are repeated also on the façade. Thin lesenes start from the pillars' centres, reaching the upper frame. The capitals are decorated by animals (lions, wild boars), and human figures (mostly heads, but also angels and others), as well as by vegetable or fantastic motifs of pre-Romanesque origin.

Under the narthex, between the central portal and the left aisle's portal, is the 15th-century sarcophagus of Pietro Candido Decembrio. The central portal is flanked by two multi-column pillars, and has an archivolt with decorative elements of Sassanid inspiration.

The basilica has two bell towers. The right one, called dei Monaci ("of the Monks"), is from the 9th century and has a severe appearance typical of defensive structures. The left and higher one dates from 1144, with the last two floors added in 1889. It was likely designed by the same architect of the Romanesque basilica since it contains the same decorative elements.

There is also an octagonal tower over the east end of the nave.

=== Interior ===
The basilica has a semi-circular apse, and smaller, semi-circular chapels at the end of the aisles; there is no transept. The interior has the same size as the external portico.

The ceiling features groin vaults with ogives, each supported by its own semi-pillar or semi-column, which, in the lower section, become a single pillar. The aisles' spans measure exactly half of those in the nave and are supported by lesser pillars. The matronei (galleries) over the aisles support the vaults but preclude clerestory windows. The third central span, on the left, houses the 12th-century Romanesque ambon or pulpit, built on a pre-existing 9th century one; which utilizes as a base a 4th-century Roman sarcophagus, traditionally known as the Sarcophagus of Stilicho. It has nine small columns with decorated capitals and friezes, featuring animal and human figures, as well as vegetable and fantastic motifs. The front of the ambon is decorated by two gilt copper reliefs, depicting the symbols of two evangelists, Saints Matthew (praying man) and John (eagle).

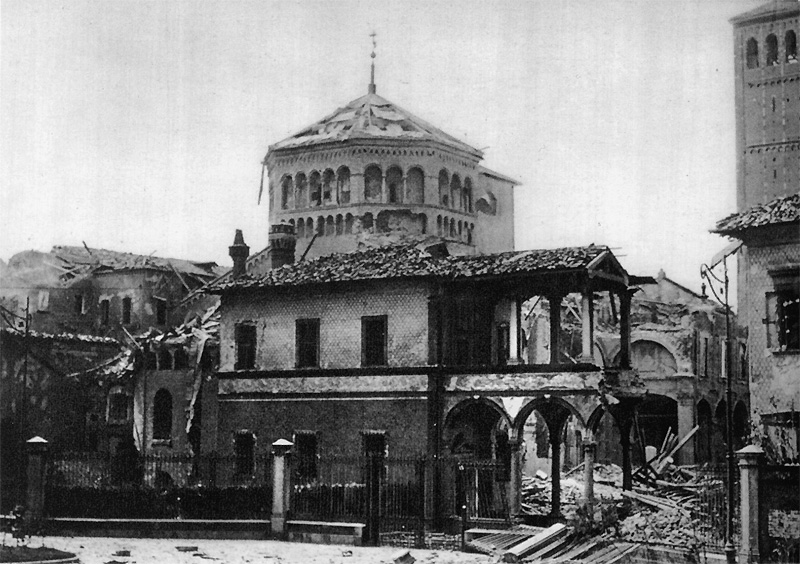
The church after the 1943 Anglo-American bombings

Under the dome cladding, in the last span of the nave, is the presbytery with, in its center, the high altar. This was realized in 824–859 by Volvinius. It features a golden antependium with precious stones on both sides. The altar is surmounted by a contemporary ciborium, commissioned by archbishop of Milan Angilbert II, whence its common name. It has four columns in red porphyry and has, on each side, bar-reliefs depicting Christ with Sts Peter and Paulus (front side), St. Ambrose Receives the Homage from Two Monks, at the Presence of Sts Gervasius and Protasus (rear side), St Benedict Receives the Homage from Two monks (left side), and St. Scholastica Receives the Homage from Two Nuns (right side).

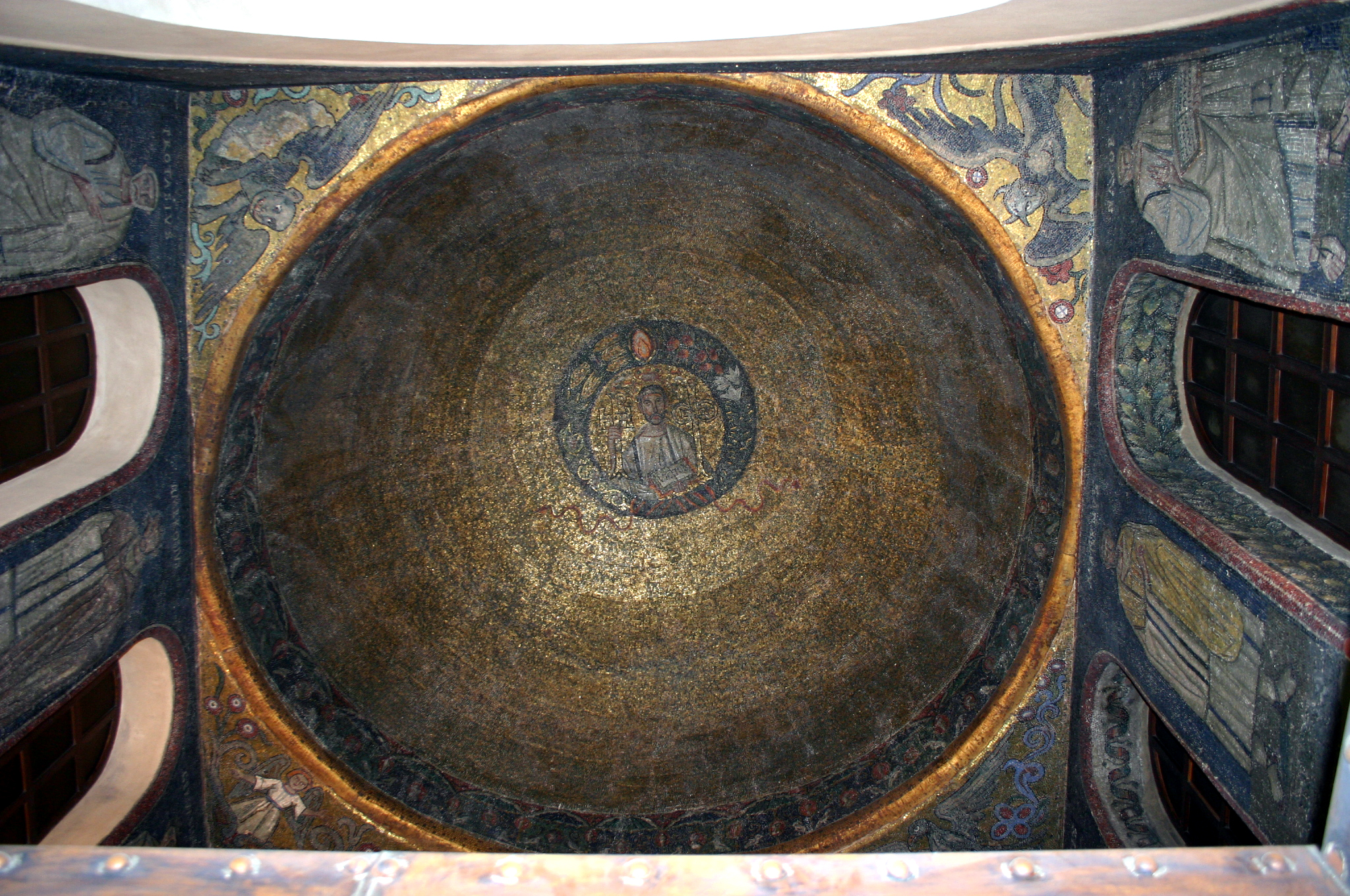
Ceiling of the Oratory of San Vittore in Ciel d'Oro

The apse displays an early 13th-century mosaic, depicting Christ Pantokrator with Sts Gervasus and Protasus, and at the sides, Scenes from the Life of St. Ambrose. The apse mosaic was heavily restored after damage during Second World War.

The oratory of San Vittore in Ciel d'Oro was originally a free-standing chapel, putatively begun in the 4th century, and thus pre-dating the church, commissioned by bishop Maternus to hold the relics of San Vittore. Bishop Ambrose supposedly buried his brother, San Satiro, in the chapel. The mosaics on the walls and ceiling were created in the 5th century; these include one of the earliest portraits of St Ambrose. The gilded dome ceiling has a central portrait of the patron saint.

The church also houses the tomb of Emperor Louis II, who died in Lombardy in 875. The crypt, located under the high altar, was built in the 9th century to house the remains of three saints venerated here: Ambrose, Gervasus and Protasus. The remains of the saints were already in a crypt in the area, although their position has since been lost over the centuries. In the 9th century bishop, Angilbert found them and had them put in a single porphyry sarcophagus. The current appearance of the crypt dates from the 18th-century restoration commissioned by cardinal Benedetto Erba Odescalchi and to others from the following century, in which the bodies of the three saints were moved to a silver urn in a space under the ciborium.

== Myth ==
Immediately beside the church, there is a white marble column with two holes. According to tradition, these were made by the Devil hitting the column with his horns because he could not seduce St. Ambrose into temptation. Thus, this column is called the Devil's Column.

== Others ==
- Royce Hall and Powell Library, at UCLA (University of California, Los Angeles), are modelled after Sant'Ambrogio.

== See also ==
- High medieval domes
- Early Christian churches in Milan
