= Jacques Du Frische =

French Benedictine theologian

- Born: 1640; Sées
- Died: May 15, 1693 (aged 52–53); Saint-Germain-des-Prés
- Occupation: Theologian

Jacques Du Frische (1640–1693) was a French Benedictine theologian.
