= Clarke's Bookshop =

Independent bookstore in South Africa

Coordinates: 33.925107°S 18.416519°E

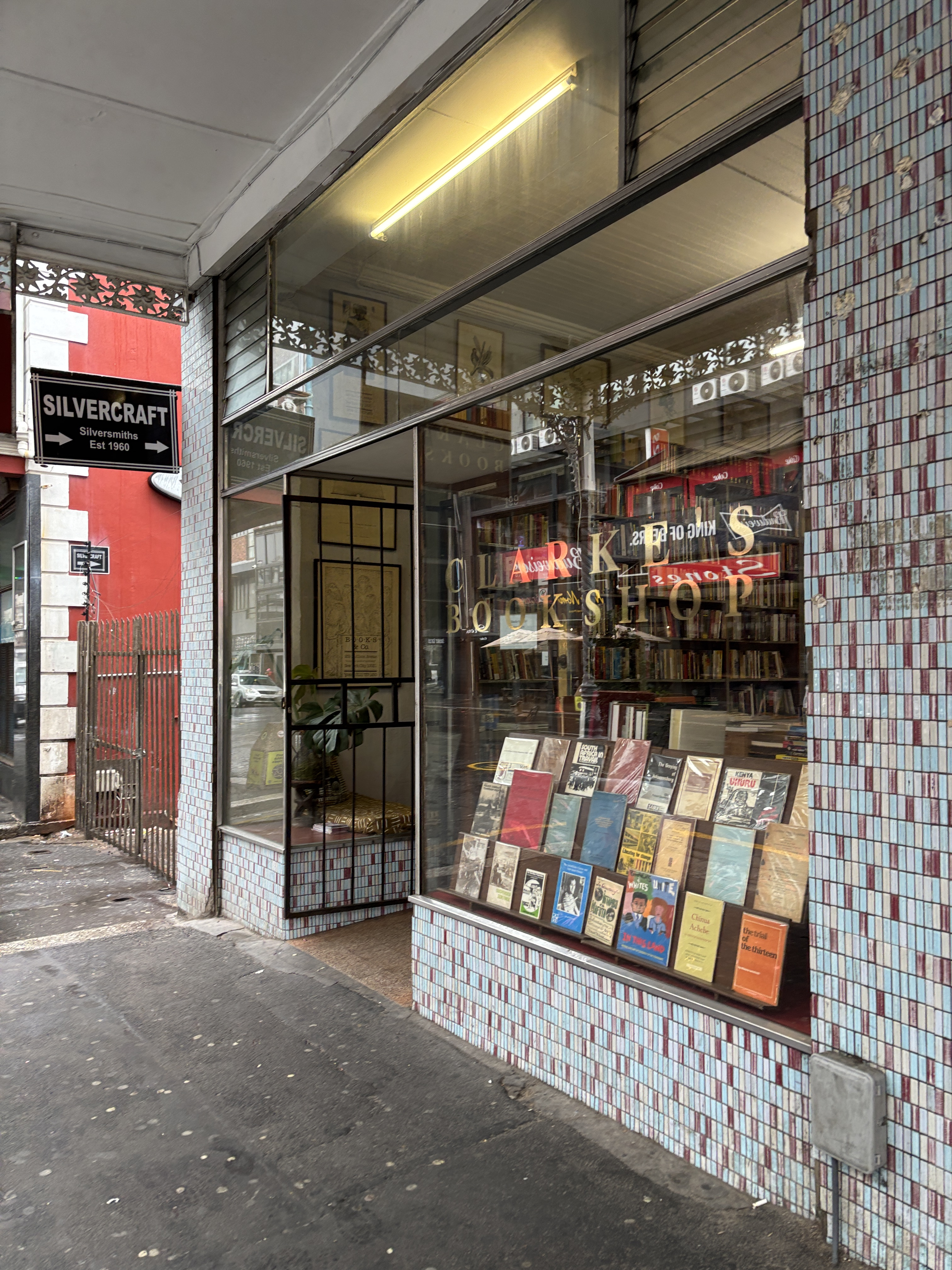
- Clarke's Bookshop in 2026
- Industry: Bookshop
- Founded: November 1957
- Founder: Anthony Clarke
- Headquarters: Cape Town, South Africa
- Number of locations: 1
- Products: Africana books
- Website: clarkesbooks.co.za

Clarke's Bookshop is an independent bookstore and library supplier located in Long Street, Cape Town. Opened in 1957 (Note: Most sources state that the bookstore was opened in 1956, but some, including the business's official website, claim it was established in 1957.) by former British Army officer Anthony Clarke, the business specialises in Africana books largely focused on Southern Africa, offering new, used, antiquarian and out-of-print products. It also supplies material to various international institutions, including the British Library, the Smithsonian Institution, Columbia University, Cambridge University and Yale University. The Irish Independent ranked Clarke's Bookshop among 'The 10 Best Bookshops in the World' in 2009. English singer Dua Lipa listed the bookstore as one of her favourite establishments in the world in 2026, and it was highlighted as a key independent bookstore in her lifestyle newsletter Service95.

== History ==
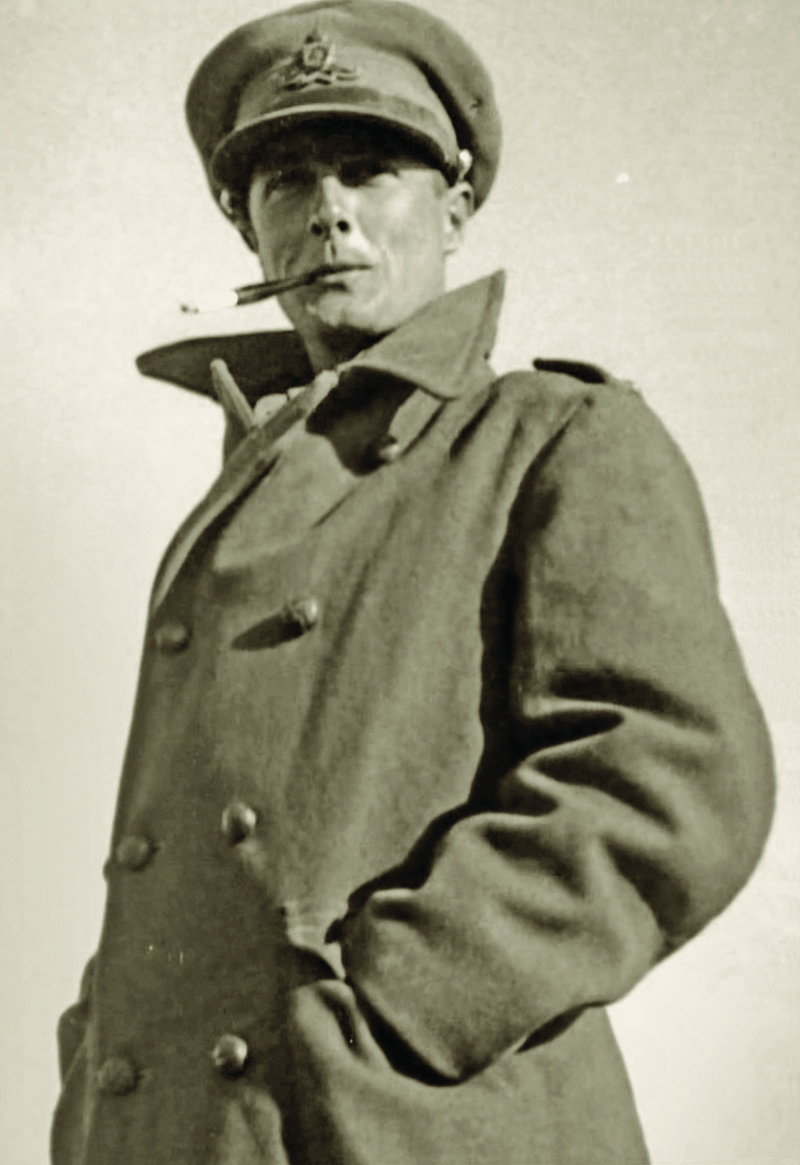
Anthony Clarke

Clarke's Bookshop was opened in November 1957 as a second-hand bookstore. It was founded by Anthony "Tony" Clarke MC who had formerly served as a captain and commander of the Chestnut Troop "A" Battery in the 1st regiment Royal Horse Artillery of the British Army. A gay man, Clarke hailed from Richmond, Surrey, and moved to Cape Town in 1947 to become a journalist for the Cape Times. He had become known for defying orders to bombard the town of Sansepolcro in an effort to preserve Piero della Francesca's fresco The Resurrection during the Italian Campaign in 1944. A suburban street in Sansepolcro was named after Clarke, who was granted honorary citizenship from the mayor, and an 18th-century print of the same painting remains on display in Clarke's Bookshop. Before becoming a prominent antiquarian auctioneer, Edward Bernardi worked under Clarke as a shop assistant from the 1960s, describing him as a "poet", a "mentor" and a "dear friend."

The bookshop began specialising in Africana books from the 1970s. Amidst strict censorship under South Africa's apartheid regime, Clarke's Bookshop also sold books that had been banned by the government. Paul Mills became a co-owner in 1978. Henrietta Dax began working at the business in 1981 shortly before Clarke's death, and later became its sole proprietor in 1998 following Mills's departure. Born in London and raised between the US, France and England, she had previously worked at Stuttafords Bookshop for two years and then at Exclusive Books for another seven years. Her work at Clarke's involved regularly embarking on 4000-mile road trips throughout countries in Southern Africa, where she bought, sold and bartered. Dax is credited with expanding the business to include new, first-hand books alongside its second-hand material. She also initiated the business's supply of African studies material to various international universities. Clarke's Bookshop has since distributed resources to Cambridge University Library, the British Library, Frankfurt University Library, Columbia University Library, Yale University Library, the Smithsonian Institution's National Museum of African Art, and Leiden University's African Studies Centre. In 1995, the International Federation of Library Associations and Institutions (IFLA) listed Clarke's Bookshop among the "best dealers" for materials relating to Southern Africa. In addition to being their supplier, the business has the active support and advocacy of the Western Cape Provincial Library. It offers new, used, antiquarian and out-of-print Africana books, spanning across genres of fiction, non-fiction, history, art, music, biography and philosophy. The bookshop also stocks old prints and maps dating back to the 16th century.

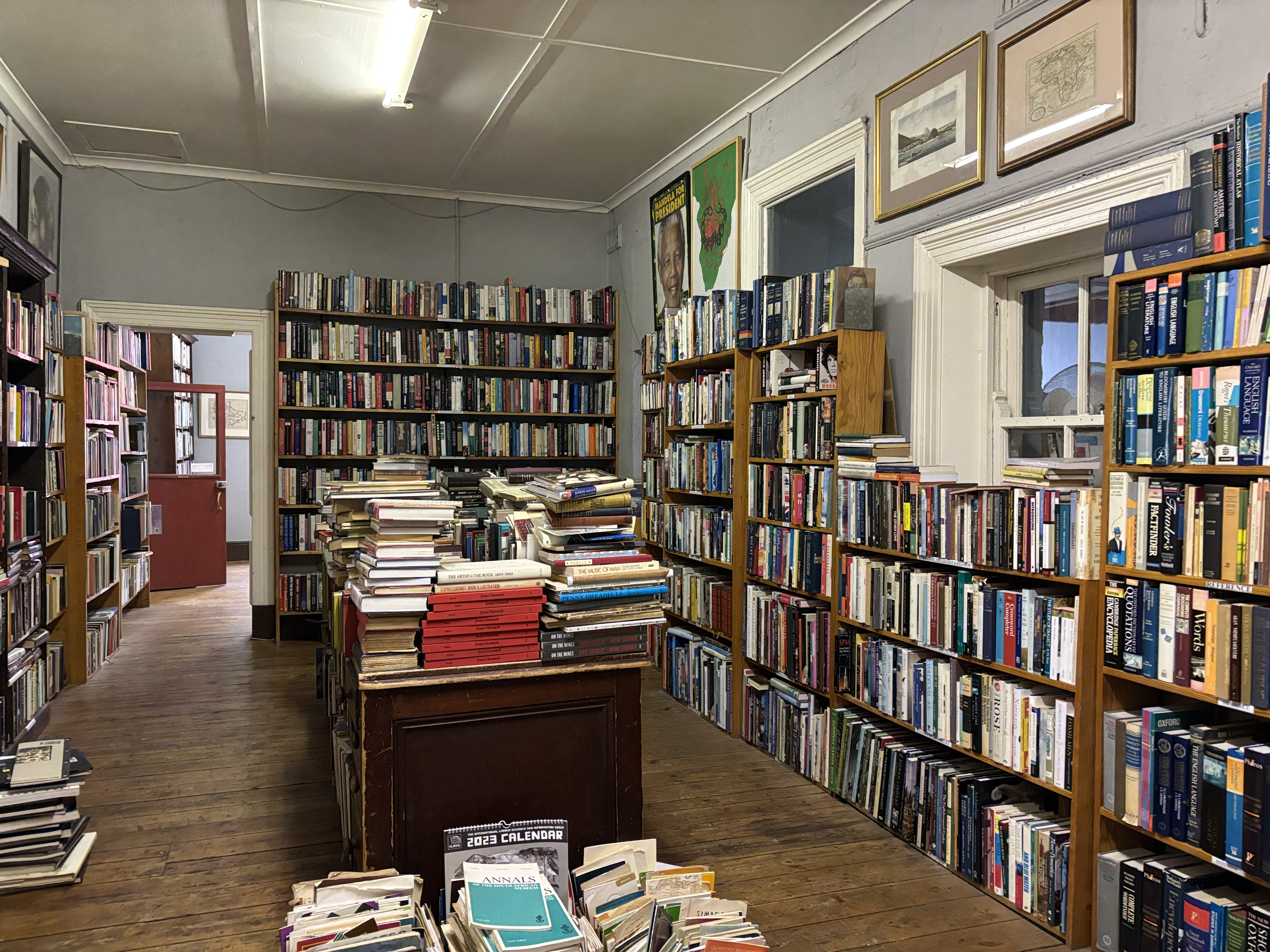
The upper level of Clarke's Bookshop in 2026

Facing potential closure after its lease wasn't renewed in two years, the business relocated to another building within the same block in Long Street in 2012. Due to financial strain amidst the COVID-19 pandemic in 2020, the bookstore conducted a fundraising auction featuring works by William Kentridge, Jane Alexander, Brett Murray, Sanell Aggenbach, and Penny Siopis among others. The business also donated new and replacement materials to the Jagger Library for African Studies at the University of Cape Town after it was destroyed by the 2021 Table Mountain fire. Having worked Clarke's Bookshop since 2003, Andre Sales became co-director of the business in 2020. Politicians such as the current President of South Africa Cyril Ramaphosa and former Deputy President Kgalema Motlanthe are frequent customers at the bookstore.

== Accolades ==
- 2002 – Merit Award (Sefika Awards)
- 2005 – Best Independent Bookseller (Sefika Awards)
- 2007 – Library Supplier of the Year (Sefika Awards)
- 2009 – No. 4 on 'The 10 Best Bookshops in the World' (Irish Independent)
- 2016 – Henrietta Dax awarded 'Lifetime's Contribution to Bookselling in South Africa' (Sefika Awards)
