= Film and Publication Board =

South African content classification authority

- FPB logo

Film ratings, online regulation overview
- Formed: 1996; 30 years ago - Publication Board; 1996; 30 years ago
- Headquarters: Centurion, Gauteng; South Africa
- Annual budget: R 125 million 2022/23
- Minister responsible: Solly Malatsi, Minister of Communications and Digital Technologies
- Film ratings, online regulation executive: Zamantungwa Mkosi, Chairperson
- Parent department: Department of Communications and Digital Technologies
- Key document: Films and Publications Act, 1996
- Website: fpb.org.za

The Film and Publication Board (FPB) has the responsibility of classifying films, games and certain publications in line with South African values and norms under the overarching application of the Bill of Rights.

The role of the FPB has previously been distinct as regulating the distribution of content, which was easily identifiable, falls within the jurisdiction of FPB. Films were either distributed via VHS, disc (DVD and Blu-ray) and in cinema format, games were likewise distributed in disc format whereas publications were in pre-packaged magazines and books. With developments in technology however, content has moved to online streaming or digital platforms. Consumers, and particularly children, now can access content which may not have been appropriately classified and labelled through such online streaming and digital platforms.

The Film and Publications Amendment Act, 11 of 2019 (FPA Act) as amended came into operation on 1 March 2023. The purpose of the amendments in the FPA Act therefore is to close the regulatory gap that currently exists in the expanded market. Consumers, and children in particular, run a risk of exposure to harmful content which is distributed on online streaming and digital platforms. What is deemed to be harmful content may differ from one jurisdiction to the next. Harmful content is a value laden concept and it is important for it to reflect the societal values and norms of that country. The amendments therefore extend the current rating system and content regulatory regime to digital and online content providing services. This enhances the protection of children and limit consumer concerns and confusion.

In addition to objects captured in section 2 (a) to (c) of the FP Act, the FPA Act inserts the following objects of the legislation: criminalising the possession, production and distribution of child pornography; and creating offences for non-compliance with the FP Act.

It must be acknowledged that there is a need to improve coordination in regulating the creation, possession and distribution of audio-visual services and certain publications and by same ensure the protection of children and consumers from harmful and illegal digital and online content on all platforms. Co-ordination and collaboration amongst and between organs of state and industry is required to ensure future-proof regulation regime for the audio-visual services and publication sector.

== History ==
The Film and Publication Board was established directly under the directive set out in the Films and Publications Act of 1996, shortly after South Africa achieved independence from apartheid rule. The Board's function would be to receive complaints, or applications to evaluate a film or publication, and classify it according to its suitability for different audiences. These publications could include movies, television programs, computer games, and music.

The classification of a film or publication would trigger various prohibitions on possessing, exhibiting, distributing or advertising the film or publication. Different ratings were devised, the most serious of which was "X18", which prohibited anyone without a specific licence from distributing the content, which had to be conducted within "adult premises".

Certain key exemptions from prohibitions were made to the scientific community (in regard to bona fide scientific, documentary, dramatic, artistic, literary or religious films and publications), and the media (in that those holding a broadcasting licence were exempt from the duty to apply for classification).

An appeals process was also defined under the Act, allowing rulings made by the FPB to be contested and challenged.

On 3 March 2020, Netflix agreed to obey the FPB's classification rules in the distribution of content in South Africa.

On 13 March, 2023, Hee Yay agreed to obey the FPB's classification rules in the distribution of content in South Africa.

== Ratings ==
The FPB has the following rating guideline:

Icon	Rating	Description
	A	All ages allowed (not used on video games).
	PG	All ages allowed, but some parental guidance is recommended for younger or sensitive viewers
	7-9 PG	Material is not suitable for children under 7, but a caregiver or parent may decide if children between 7 and 9 years old may access the material (used only for films and games).
	10-12 PG	Material is not suitable for children under 10, but a caregiver or parent may decide if children between 10 and 12 years old may access the material (used only for films and games).
	13	Not suitable for persons under the age of 13.
	16	Not suitable for persons under the age of 16.
	18	Not suitable for persons under the age of 18.
	X18	Adults only. Only licensed, adults-only designated businesses may distribute this content, and never to minors. X18 content may not be broadcast on public media such as television or radio.
	XX	Cannot be legally sold, rented or exhibited anywhere in South Africa. The FPB has the authority to classify any content as XX if it contains extreme violence, cruelty, extreme sexual violence, bestiality, incest etc.
	refused classification	Banned. It includes child pornography, incitement to hatred against people of an identifiable group etc.

Former ratings include:

- 10 - Not suitable for persons under 10.
- 10M - Persons under 10 should be accompanied.
- 13M - Persons under 13 should be accompanied.

Additionally, the FPB provides the following content classifications:

Icon	Rating	Name	Description
	<led>L</led>	Bad Language	"insensitive, demeaning, derogatory, disrespectful, or irreverent expressions that are not considered hate speech
	CI	Competitive Intensity	the degree to which a player gets personally involved, and the level of excitement created in the players as they engage with the various game levels in order to gain incentives and rewards
	CT	Criminal Techniques	instructional details of illegal and dangerous acts that may be life-threatening and that are detailed enough to be re-enacted or self-instructional
	D	Drugs	scenes of substance (drugs and alcohol) abuse
	H	Horror	scenes of horror
	IAT	Imitative Acts or Techniques	dangerous acts or techniques that may be copied or imitated, especially by children
	L	Language	use of bad language
	LFN	Low frequency noise	noise below a frequency of 100 to 150 hertz
	N	Nudity	scenes involving nudity
	P	Prejudice	scenes or language that is biased or prejudiced with regard to race, ethnicity, gender, religion, sexual orientation or other identifiable group characteristics
	PPS	Photo Pattern Sensitivity	motion sickness and reactions to low frequency sound
	S	Sex	scenes involving sex, sexual conduct or sexually related activity
	SV	Sexual Violence	scenes involving rape or other violent sexual acts
	V	Violence	physical and psychological violent scenes

== Criticism ==
=== The Spear ===
In 2012, the Goodman Gallery in Cape Town, showcased a painting by artist Brett Murray. It depicted President Jacob Zuma in a pose reminiscent of Lenin, but with fully exposed genitalia. The painting drew swift condemnation from the ANC ruling party, who condemned the artist, the artwork, and all media outlets who had published images of the painting. Shortly after, the Film and Publication board sent five assessors to provide a rating for the artwork, a move that was harshly criticized for being well outside its mandate, and beyond the remit of the purpose of the FPB. Despite this, the FPB issued an "16N" rating, which meant that the Gallery could no longer publicly show the painting if there were children in the building.

During the classification proceedings, there were allegations that the FPB was acting outside its statutory remit, and that specific members had made statements or asked questions implying that it was entitled to censor political opinions and restrict freedom of the press.

This decision was later appealed following a public backlash, and amidst accusations of state-led censorship. Upon appeal in October 2012, the FPB set aside its original rating, thereby effectively de-classifying the painting. This had taken place after the painting was famously defaced and sold, which rendered the ruling moot on practical terms.

=== Online Regulation Bill ===
In March 2015, the FPB gazetted a notice inviting public comment on a Draft Online Regulation policy, which sought sweeping new powers to police and regulate all aspects of content on the internet. In this draft policy, the FPB sought to classify all manner of content, including, for instance, user-submitted videos to sites such as YouTube, which would require all such content to first be classified by the FPB at a charge and labelled as FPB-approved before it would be allowed to be legally published online.

Specifically, the following sections from the draft detail the broadness of the powers FPB seek:

- 5.1.1 Any person who intends to distribute any film, game, or certain publication in the Republic of South Africa shall first comply with section 18(1) of the Act by applying, in the prescribed manner, for registration as film or game and publications distributor.
- 5.1.2 In the event that such film, game or publication is in a digital form or format intended for distribution online using the internet or other mobile platforms, the distributor may bring an application to the Board for the conclusion of an online distribution agreement, in terms of which the distributor, upon payment of the fee prescribed from time to time by the Minister of DOC as the Executive Authority, may classify its online content on behalf of the Board, using the Board's classification Guidelines and the Act.

The Electronic Frontier Foundation described the proposed legislation as follows:

Only once in a while does an Internet censorship law or regulation come along that is so audacious in its scope, so misguided in its premises, and so poorly thought out in its execution, that you have to check your calendar to make sure 1 April hasn't come around again. The Draft Online Regulation Policy recently issued by the Film and Publication Board (FPB) of South Africa is such a regulation. It's as if the fabled prude Mrs. Grundy had been brought forward from the 18th century, stumbled across hustler.com on her first excursion online, and promptly cobbled together a law to shut the Internet down. Yes, it's that bad.

— Electronic Frontier Foundation

The EFF also went on to point out that the FPB had effectively put the burden on South African ISPs to remove offending content, or replace said content with FPB-approved (and labelled) content, even on platforms such as YouTube, Vimeo and Vine.

In the response to what is understood as one of the most draconian pieces of internet legislation seen in the world, the FPB has been on the receiving end of a growing online backlash, proliferated through social media such as Facebook and Twitter. In particular, the Right2Know coalition, who advocate open government and whistleblowing, have championed the cause against FPB's draft proposal.
