= Ayanda Mabulu =

South African artist (born 1981)

- Born: 1981 (age 44–45); King William's Town, South Africa
- Education: Nompendulo High, Good Hope Art
- Known for: Arts
- Spouse: Fikile Siwela
- Website: http://www.greatmoreart.org/ayanda-mabulu.html

Ayanda Mabulu (born in 1981) is a South African artist mostly known for his paintings.

== Painting ==
Mabulu's work of 2010, Ngcono ihlwempu kunesibhanxa sesityebi (Xhosa translation: Better poor than a rich puppet), depicted various international political figures in the nude, including South African president Jacob Zuma. The painting received little critical comment at the time, but was rediscovered as part of the political controversy surrounding fellow South African Brett Murray's painting (The Spear) in May 2012.

Mabulu criticised Zuma and the African National Congress for their response to Murray's satirical painting – and that of the Nazareth Baptist (Shembe) Church, who called for Murray to be "stoned to death". He questioned their motives in attacking it, having ignored Mabulu's own work – which depicts Zuma alongside Desmond Tutu, Robert Mugabe, Barack Obama and Nelson Mandela in similar fashion. The debate provoked a response from the Worldart Gallery, where Mabulu's other paintings have been exhibited.

Ngcono ihlwempu kunesibhanxo sesityebi, 2010

== Further controversies ==
=== Zuma-Gupta ===
In 2016, Ayanda released a new painting of President Zuma performing a sexual act on Atul Gupta, the wealthy Indian-South African businessman who has been accused of influence over the president. The painting was accused of being extreme and condemned by many. South African newspapers and media reported widely on it and there was mixed reactions from across the country.

=== Zuma-Mandela ===
In April 2017, Ayanda once again released yet another artwork, this time depicting President Zuma engaged in sex with Nelson Mandela. In the image which almost went viral, the respected Mandela is sitting on Zuma with being 'fucked' while caressing his nipples with a smile on Zuma's face. Ayanda described the image as portraying what Zuma has done to Mandela's legacy. This divided opinions but more so because many South Africans who took offense were mainly angered at the debasing of the personality of the widely beloved Mandela. This time it was not only condemnation that came but also death threats which Mr Mabulu shrugged off.

Both the African National Congress (the party of the President and of Mandela) and The Nelson Mandela Foundation reacted to the painting by releasing statements. However, in a remarkable approach, both's statement combined their condemnation with upholding the need for freedom of expression.

The Nelson Mandela Foundation said:
"The Foundation would like to express that it respects Mr Mabulu’s right to freedom of expression. We however find this painting distasteful."

The African National Congress used a stronger language depicting the image as ″crossing the bounds of rationality to degradation, exploiting the craft of creative art for nefarious ends."

=== Nkosazana Dlamini-Zuma ===
In October 2017 the African National Congress Women's League described Mabulu as "mentally colonised artist" for a painting depicting then presidential hopeful Nkosazana Dlamini-Zuma in a sexual position while Zuma looks.

The Women's League said:

"[The painting] is a desperate move by the white monopoly capital and their praise singers, using a rented black painter to tarnish the image of these leaders hoping that it will stop the winding wheels of radical economic transformation."
