= Long Street (Cape Town) =

Historic street in Cape Town

- Map showing Long Street and the surrounding area.
- Interactive map of Long Street
- Location: Cape Town, South Africa
- Coordinates: 33°55′18″S 18°25′12″E

Long Street is a major street located in the City Bowl section of Cape Town, South Africa. It is famous as a bohemian hang out and the street is lined with many book stores, various ethnic restaurants and bars. Restaurants include African restaurants such as Zula, and Indian restaurants such as Masala Dosa. Long Street exhibits a diversified culture and attracts tourists from all over the world. It also has a number of youth hostels which provide accommodation to an international roster of guests. Several theatres which showed anti-apartheid plays were located on the street during the 1970s and 1980s, although most have now closed and been replaced by restaurants or stores.

Architecturally, it is noted for its Victorian buildings with wrought iron balconies. These were featured in an article in an edition of the annual publication The Saturday Book.

Traffic on Long Street is one-way in the uphill (southwest) direction, while the parallel Loop Street carries downhill traffic. The number 101 MyCiTi bus runs the length of Long Street on its way from the Civic Centre to Gardens, with five stops along the street.

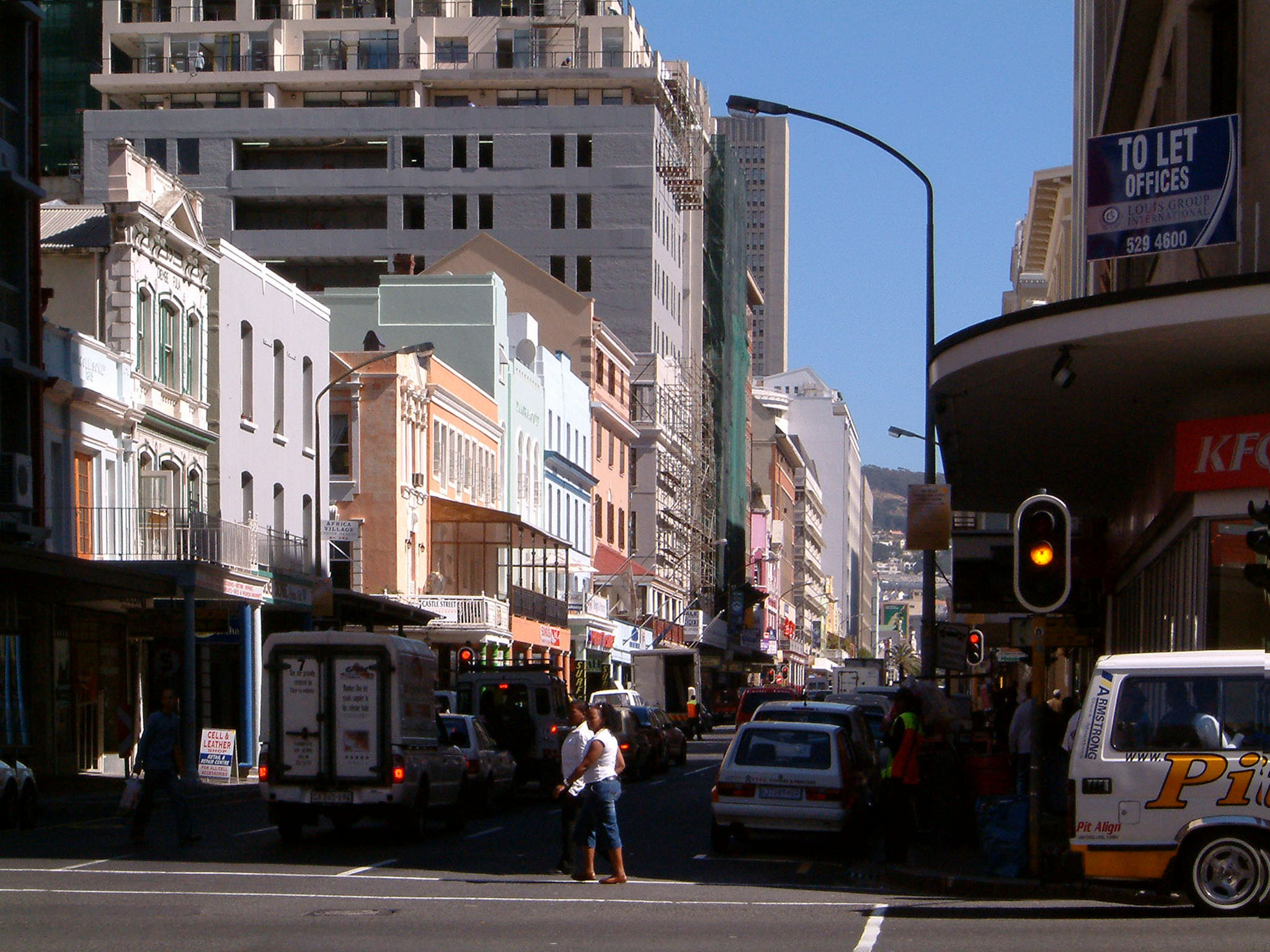
Long Street

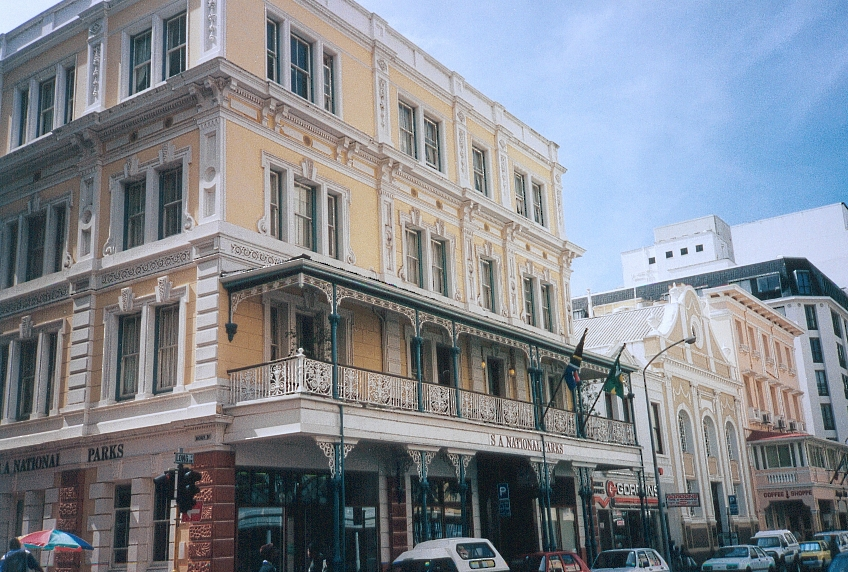
Traditional Victorian and Cape Dutch architecture on Long Street.

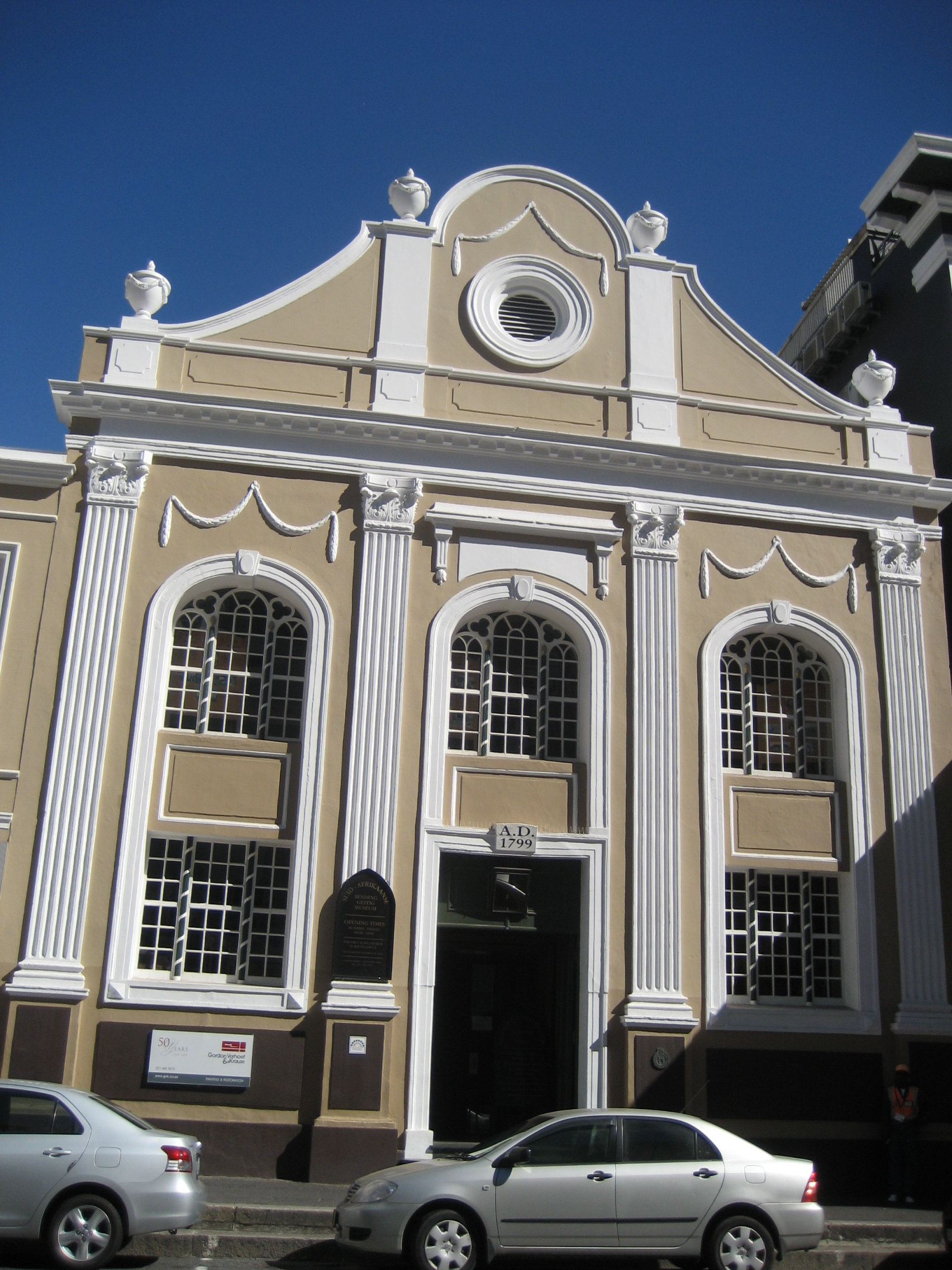
Museum of the history of South African Missionary Work (building from 1799; 227 years ago)

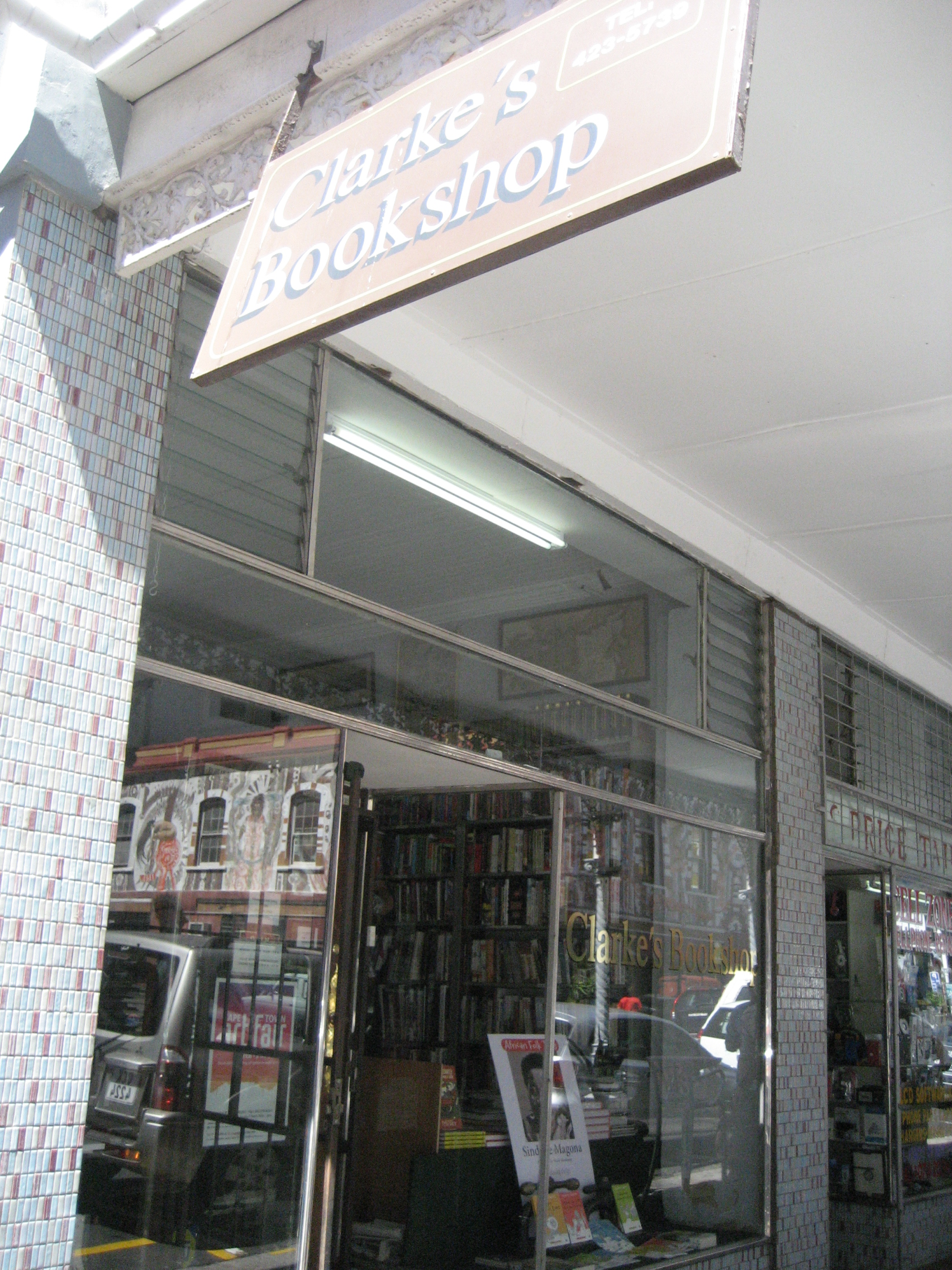
Clarke's Bookshop

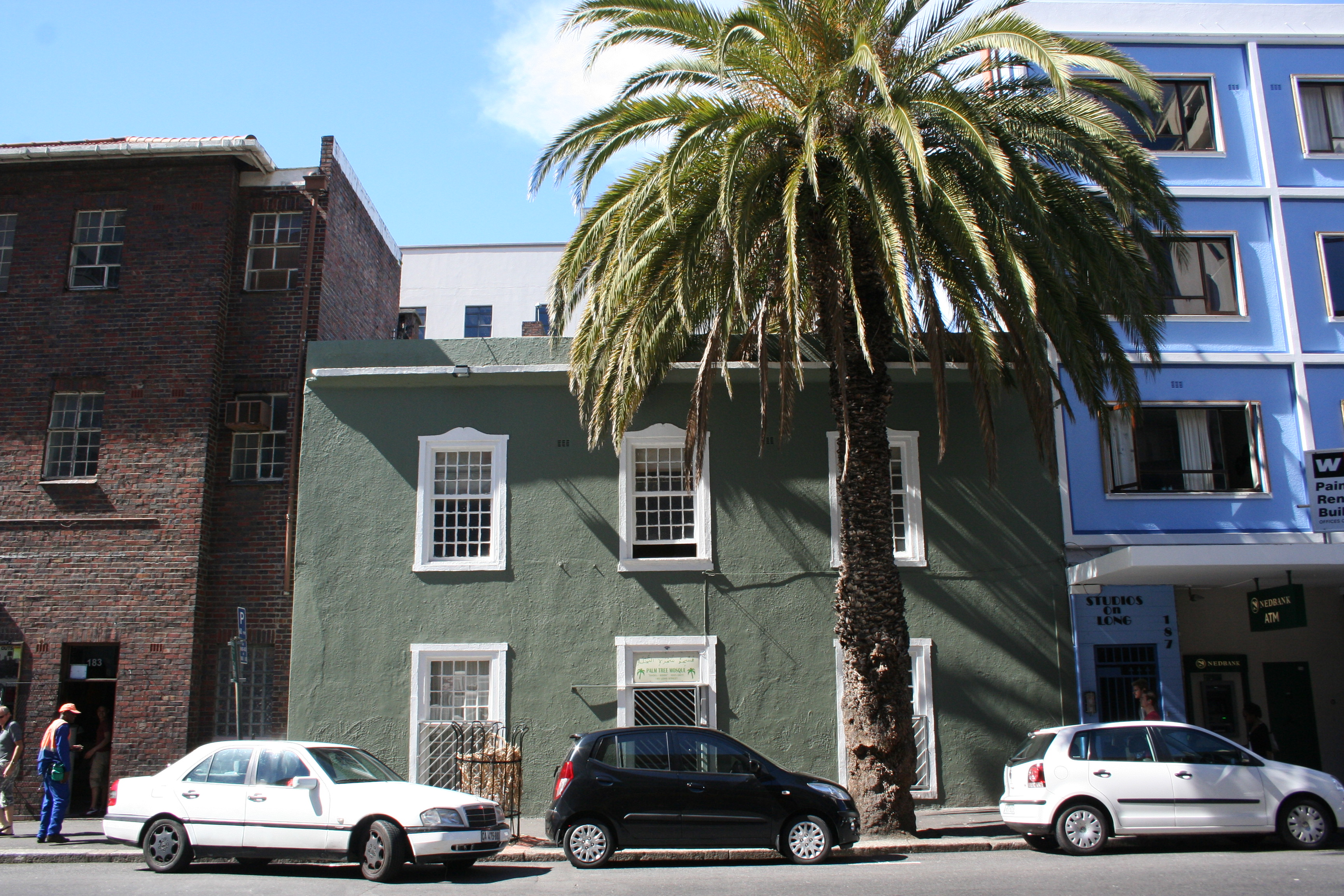
Palm Tree Mosque. The oldest substantially unaltered building in Long Street, built in 1788; 238 years ago

== See also ==
- South African Sendinggestig Museum
