= The Resurrection (Piero della Francesca) =

Fresco by Piero della Francesca

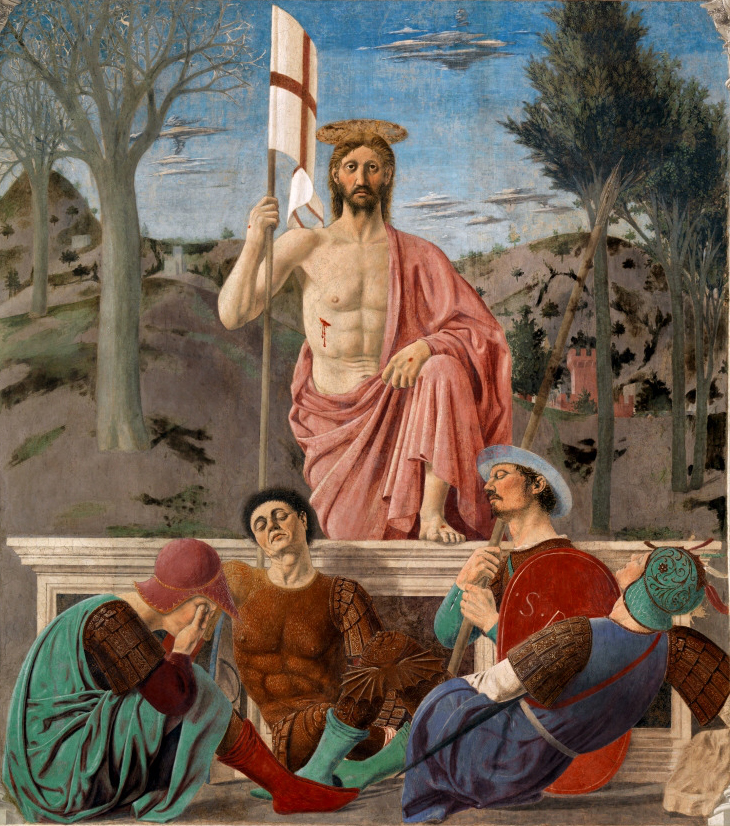
- Artist: Piero della Francesca
- Year: c. 1460s
- Type: Fresco
- Dimensions: 225 cm × 200 cm (89 in × 79 in)
- Location: Museo Civico; Sansepolcro

The Resurrection is a fresco painting by the Italian Renaissance master Piero della Francesca, painted in the 1460s in the Palazzo della Residenza in the town of Sansepolcro, Tuscany, Italy.

Piero was commissioned to paint the fresco for the Gothic-style Residenza, the communal meeting hall. This was used solely by Conservatori, the chief magistrates and governors, who, before starting their councils, would pray before the image. "The secular and spiritual meanings of the painting were always intimately intertwined." Placed high on the interior wall facing the entrance, the fresco includes an allusion to the name of the city (meaning "Holy Sepulchre"), derived from the presence of two relics of the Holy Sepulchre carried here by two pilgrims in the 9th century. Della Francesca's 'Christ' is also featured on the town's coat of arms.

== Composition ==
Jesus is in the centre of the composition, portrayed in the moment of his resurrection, as suggested by the position of the leg on the parapet of his tomb, which Piero renders as a classical sarcophagus. His stern, impassive figure, depicted in an iconic and abstract fixity (and described by Aldous Huxley as "athletic"), rises over four sleeping soldiers, representing the difference between the human and the divine spheres (or the death, defeated by Christ's light). His figure in the commune's council hall "both protects the judge and purifies the judged" according to Marilyn Aronberg Lavin. The landscape, immersed in the dawn light, has also a symbolic value: the contrast between the flourishing young trees on the right and the bare mature ones on the left alludes to the renovation of men through the Resurrection's light.

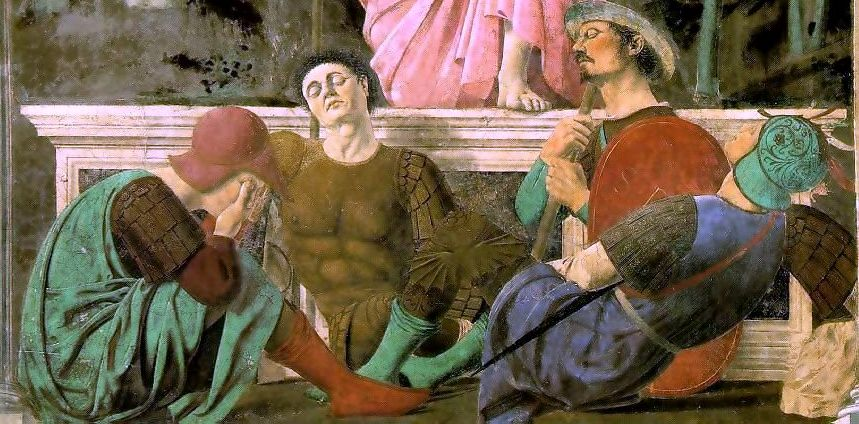
Note the impossible pose of the guard holding a spear. To achieve a more harmonious composition, Piero left the soldier without legs.

Andrew Graham-Dixon notes that apart from the wound, Christ's "body is as perfectly sculpted and as blemish-free as that of an antique statue. But there are touches of intense humanity about him too: the unidealised, almost coarse-featured face; and those three folds of skin that wrinkle at his belly as he raises his left leg. Piero emphasises his twofold nature, as both man and God."

The guard holding the lance is depicted sitting in an anatomically impossible pose, and appears to have no legs. Piero probably left them out so as not to break the balance of the composition.

According to tradition and by comparison with the woodcut illustrating Giorgio Vasari's Lives of the Painters, the sleeping soldier in brown armor on Christ's right is a self-portrait of Piero. The contact between the soldier's head and the pole of the banner carried by Christ is supposed to represent his contact with the divinity.

The composition is unusual in that it contains two vanishing points. One is in the center of the sarcophagus, because the faces of the guards are seen from below, and the other is in Jesus's face. The top of the sarcophagus forms a boundary between the two points of view, and the steepness of the hills prevents the transition between the two points of view from being too jarring.

== Near-destruction ==
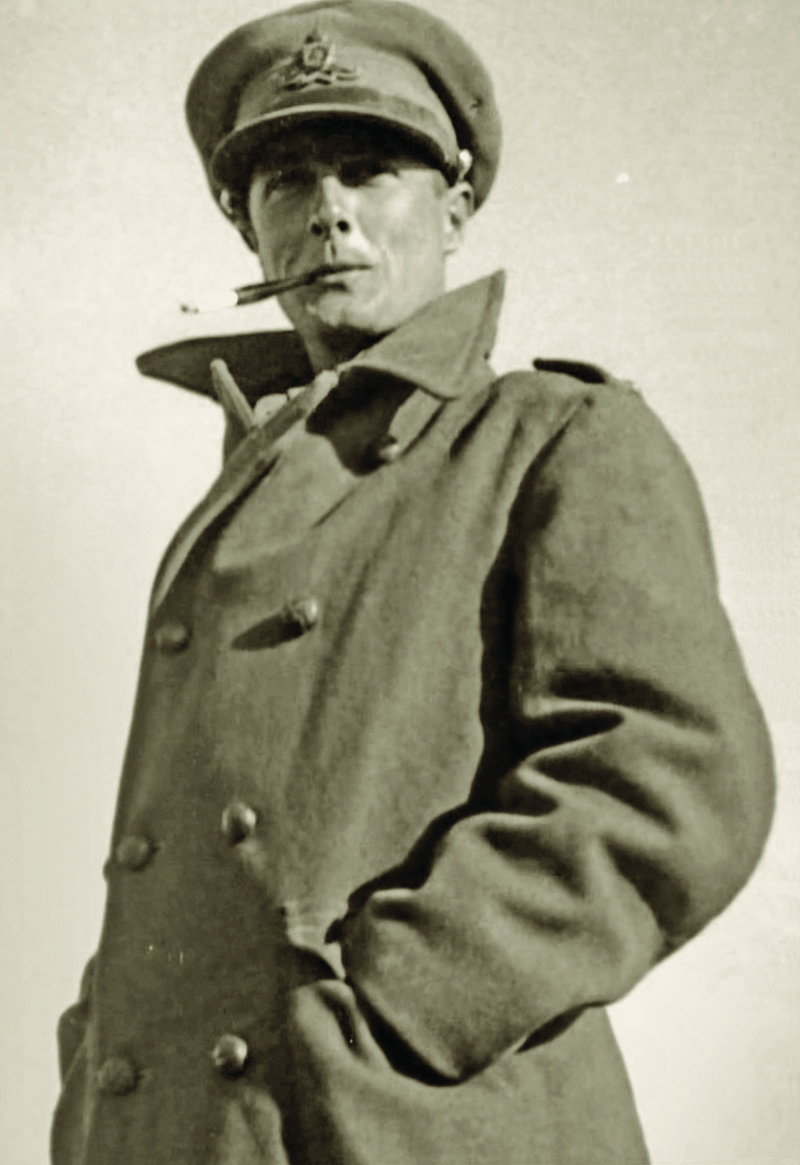
Tony Clarke

Sansepolcro was spared much damage during World War 2 when British artillery officer Anthony "Tony" Clarke defied orders and held back from using his troop's guns to shell the town. Although Clarke had never seen the fresco, his diary records his shock at the destruction in Monte Cassino and, apparently remembering where he had read of Sansepolcro, ordered his men to hold fire just as methodical shelling had begun. A lover of art, Clarke had read Huxley's 1925 essay describing the Resurrection, which states: "It stands there before us in entire and actual splendour, the greatest picture in the world." It was later ascertained that the Germans were in retreat from the area – the bombardment had not been necessary, though Clarke had not known this when he ordered the shelling stopped. The town, along with its famous painting, survived. When the events of the episode eventually became clear, Clarke was lauded as a local hero and to this day a street in Sansepolcro bears his name. Clarke later established Clarke's Bookshop in Cape Town, South Africa in 1957, where an 18th century print of the artwork is displayed in his honour.

== See also ==
- 100 Great Paintings, 1980 BBC series

== Bibliography ==
- Frosinini, Cecilia (2022). La Resurrezione di Piero della Francesca: il restauro della "pittura più bella del mondo", tra memorie di storia civica e scoperte, Edifir ISBN 9788879709729
- Manescalchi, Roberto (2008). Il Cristo Risorto di Piero immagini rare e desuete. Sansepolcro: Aboca Museum.
- Manescalchi, Roberto (2008). Amintore Fanfani e Giulio Gambassi, Il Cristo Risorto di Piero della Francesca: Una battaglia per l'arte. Firenze: Grafica European Center of Fine Arts.
- Refice, Paola. "La Resurrezione: questioni iconografiche", in 1492. Rivista della Fondazione Piero della Francesca», vol. IX (2016), no. 1, pp. 15–33
- Refice, Paola. "La frammentaria epigrafe dipinta nella Resurrezione di Piero della Francesca: un'ipotesi di ricostruzione", in Prospettiva, nos. 163/164 (July–October 2016), pp. 95–97
- Zuggi, Stefano (1991). Piero della Francesca. Milan: Elemond.
