= South African Sendinggestig Museum =

- Suid-Afrikaanse Sendinggestig Museum
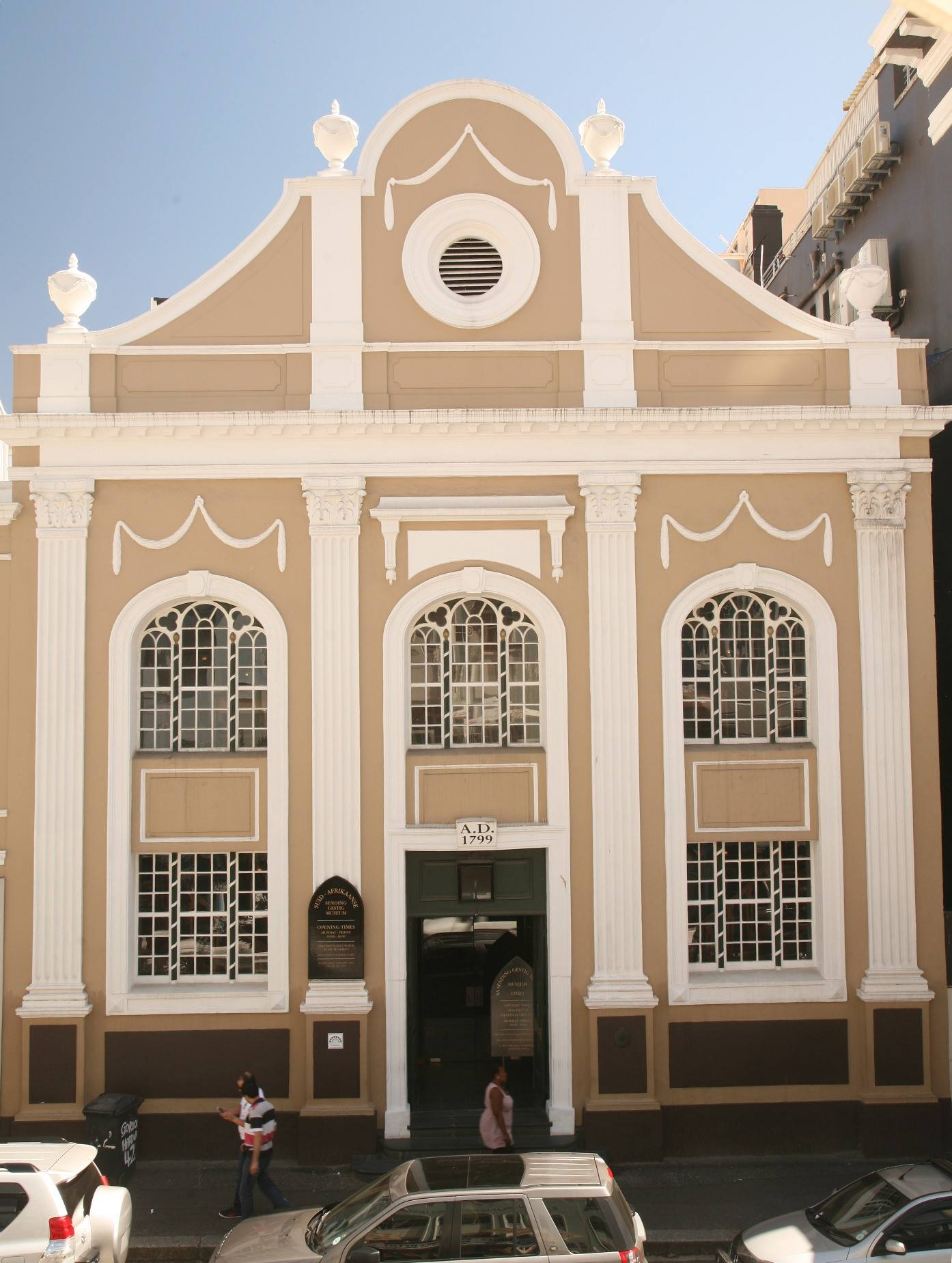
- Sendinggestig Museum Facade
- Established: 1977
- Location: 40 Long Street, Cape Town
- Coordinates: 33.921335°S 18.420509°E
- Type: Church Museum
- Accreditation: Western Cape Museum Service
- Collections: Furniture, church objects, photographs and documents
- Curator: Jaline de Villiers
- Public transit access: MyCity buses and MetroRail trains
- Parking: In front of Museum

The South African Sendinggestig Museum (also known as the South African Slave Church Museum) was established in 1977 and is currently situated in the centre of Cape Town, Western Cape, South Africa, and housed in the oldest indigenous mission church in the country built by local Christians. It is a province-aided museum which receives financial support from the Government of the Western Cape Province.

== History ==
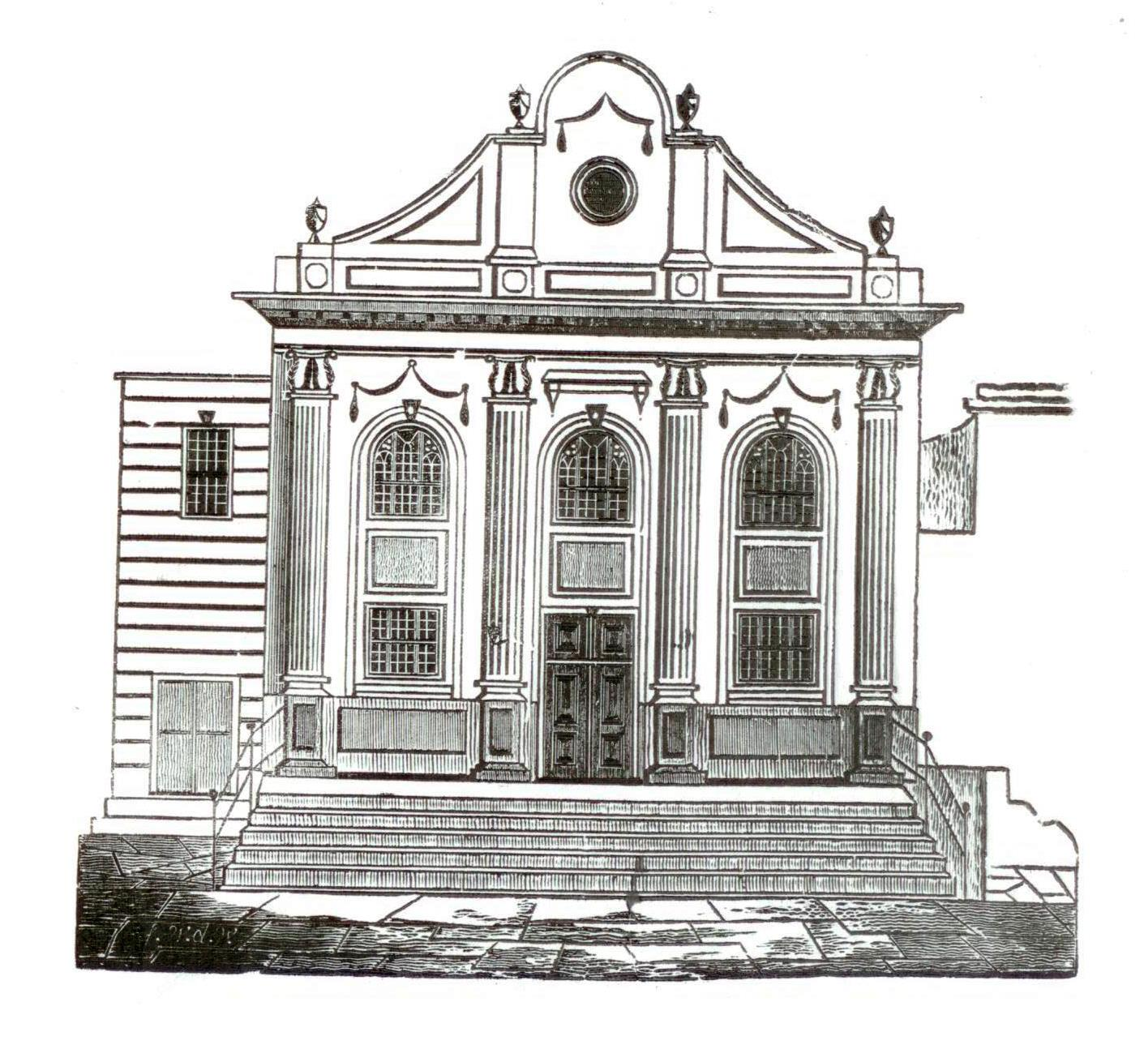
Sendinggestig c. 1830s

In 1801, the Board of Directors of the South African Society for the Advancement of Christ's Kingdom acquired a property in Long Street, Cape Town, for 50,000 guilders. The existing buildings were demolished and the Sendinggestig built. It was inaugurated on 15 March 1804 by Rev. J.P. Sеrumer of the Dutch Reformed Church's Groote Kerk, Cape Town congregation.

The Sendinggestig was not originally used for worship services. Instead people went there for prayer meetings, Bible studies or other religious and literacy classes. For this reason it was not called a church, but a "gestig" or "oefeninghuis", which is the Dutch equivalent of an American "meeting house".

Twenty years later it did become a fully-fledged church. This congregation included the poor, Khoekhoen or Khoikhoi and Slaves who converted to Christianity.

=== Building ===
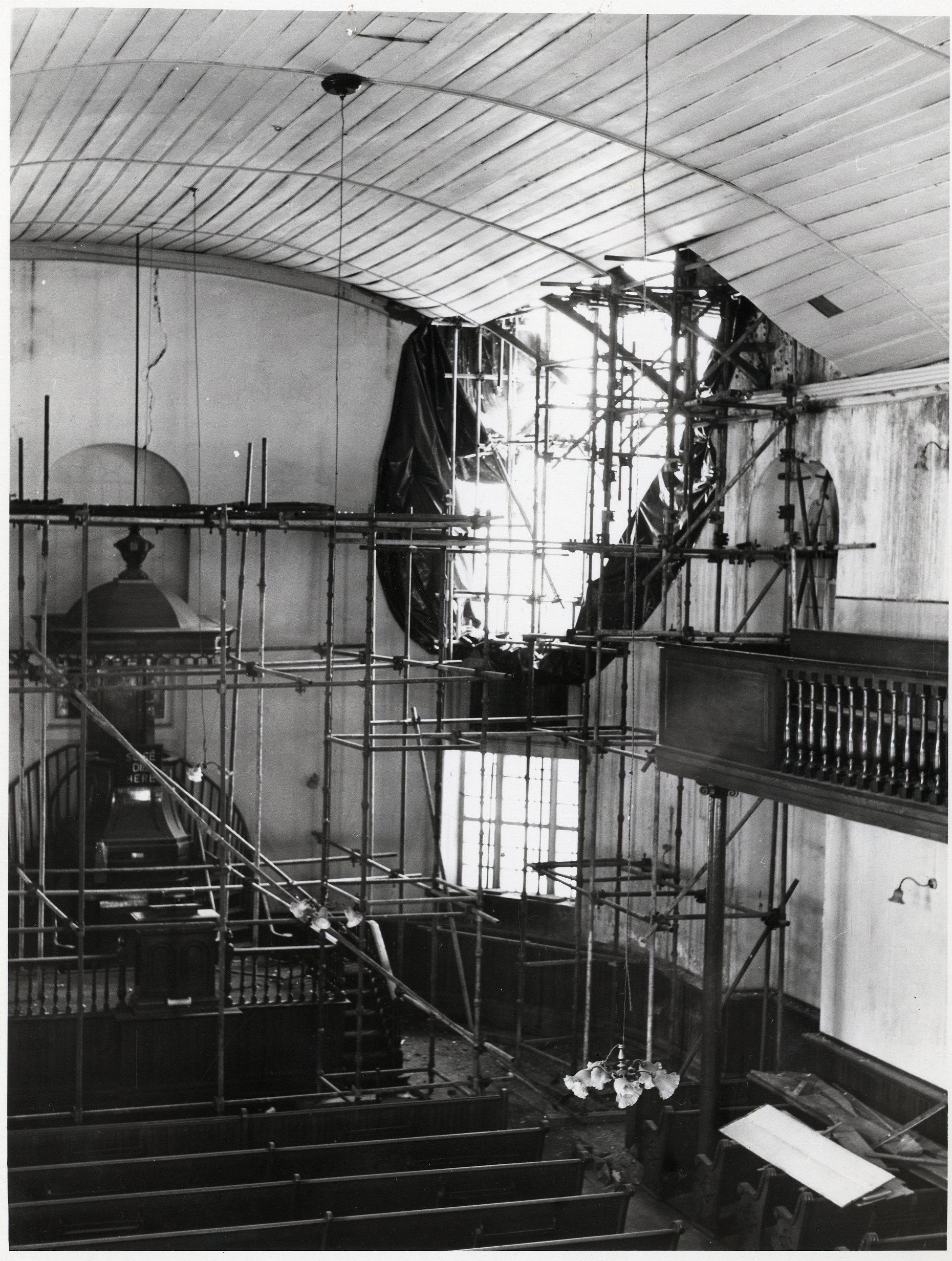
Restoration in progress c. 1978

The museum building is architecturally unique as it was South Africa's first building in the form of a basilica with an Apsis. All its windows are small scale replicas of this floor plan. It has the only surviving example of a steeply pitched lime-concrete roof - a form of construction developed at the Cape specifically for flat roofs. Its façade features Corinthian pilasters carrying a moulded Cornice and a Gable with a circular ventilator and four Urns.

By the 1970s the building was in a dilapidated state and required major restoration work to both its exterior and interior. During the winter of 1977 storms caused more damage and part of its northern wall collapsed. Restoration work began in 1978. The restoration team was able to reproduce the building's 1830s Facade according to a contemporary print by Frederick Willem de Wet.

The historical interior of the church was also faithfully reproduced, including replicas of the wall-paintings discovered during the restoration process.

=== Slaves and the Sendinggestig ===
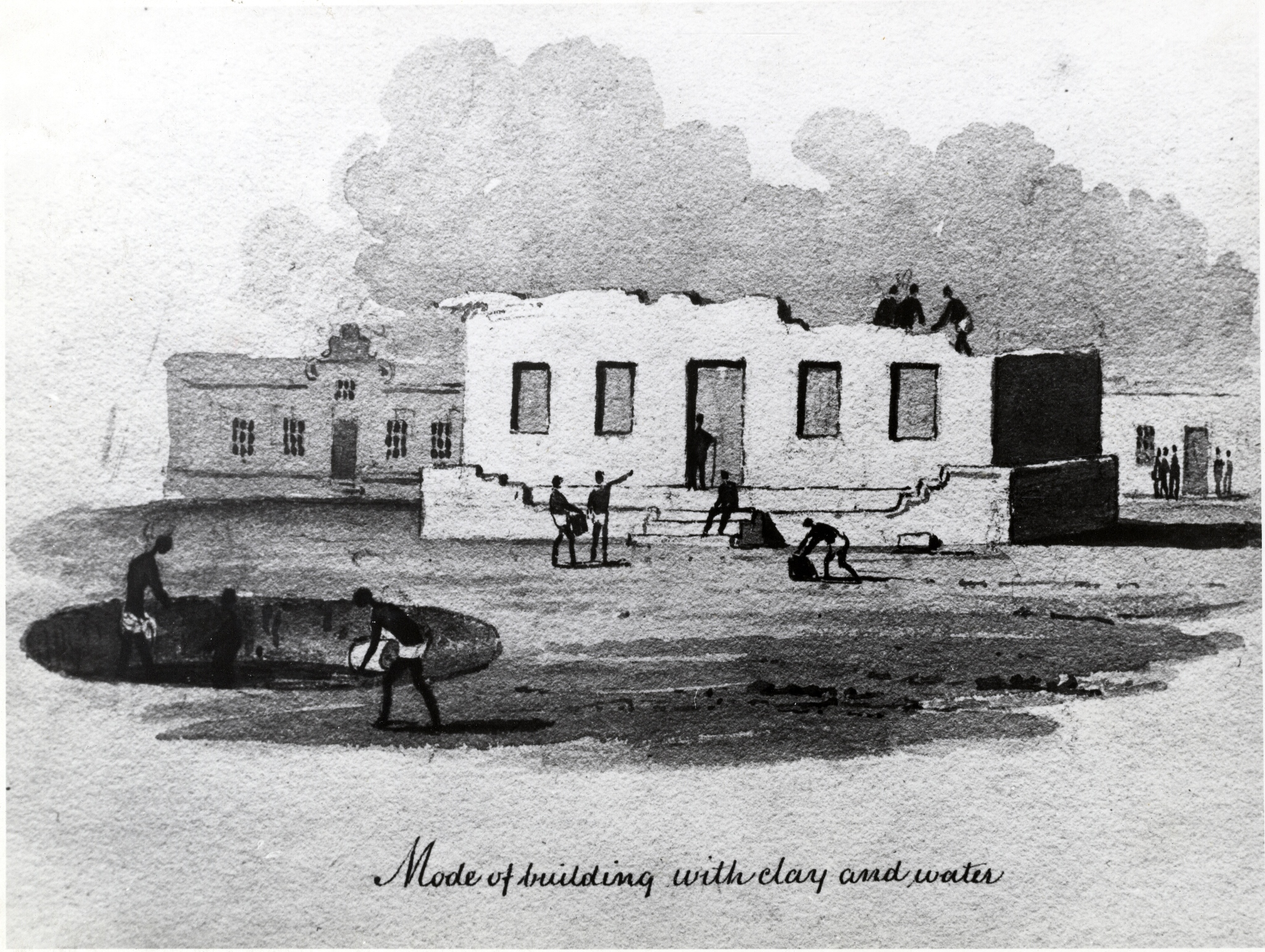
Cape Town Slaves Doing Construction Work

Since its construction the South African Gestig was closely linked to slaves. Between 1801 and 1804 slaves and free-blacks demolished the existing house on the property and cleared the site. They built the walls with stones from the Vlaeberg quarry and bricks they made. Some assisted the carpenters working on the building while others painted its walls with lime wash made with slave-labour. The front steps and floor were made from Robben Island slate. The roof used to be water-proofed with Whale oil.

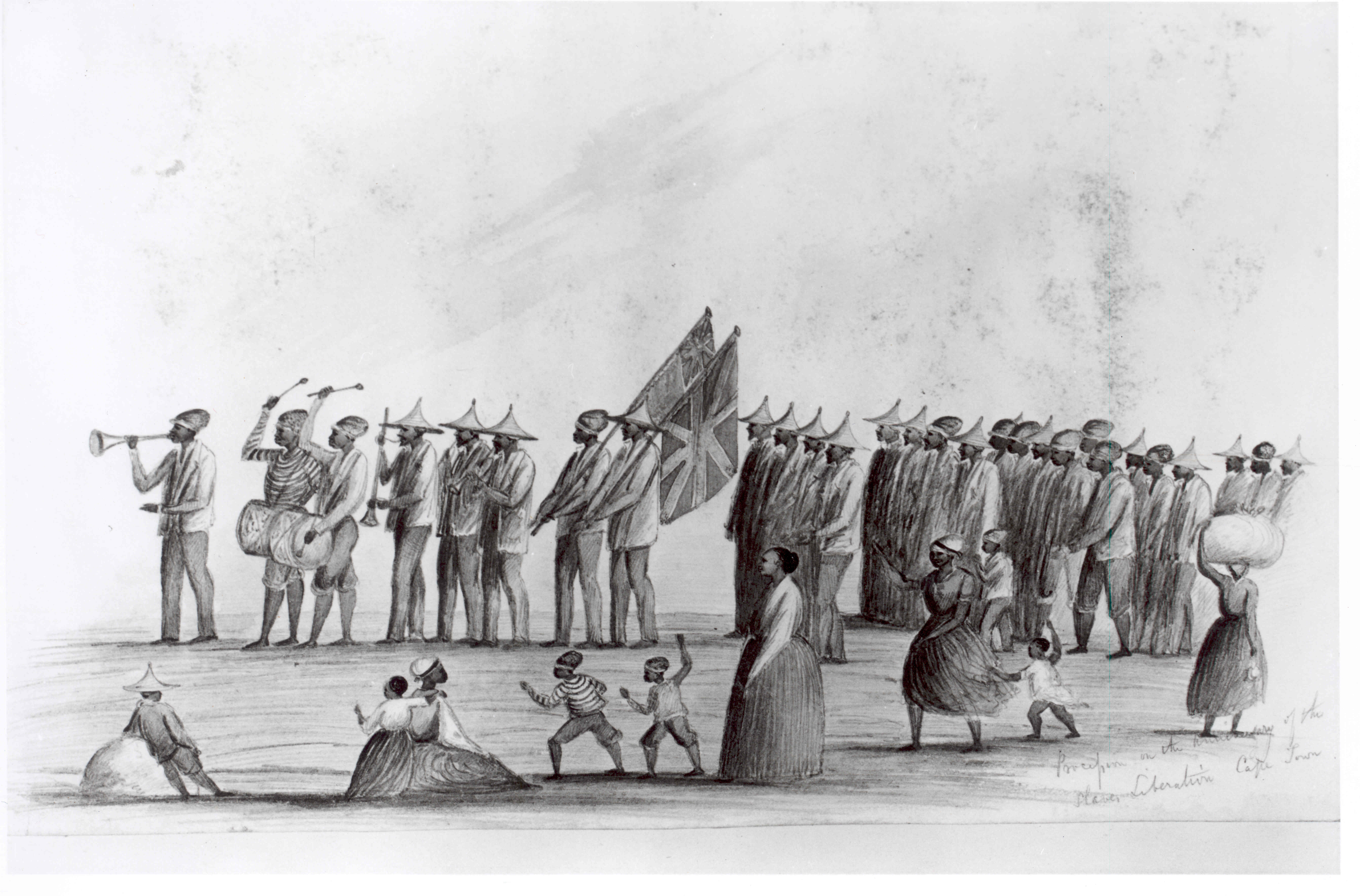
Celebrating the Emancipation of the Slaves in 1838

After the Sendinggestig opened its doors in March 1804 slaves were encouraged to attend prayer meetings there. However, these prayer meetings could not be held at the same time as church services or inconvenience slave-owners.

From early 1813 “heathen” children, including slave children, were taught to read and write there on Wednesdays and Fridays. From July 1813 adult slaves could come to an evening school at the Sendinggestig after finishing their day's work and if their owners allowed it.

In 1818 the South African Mission Society was granted some land in Somerset Road to use as burial ground for converted slaves. Slaves that were buried there received a funeral service and dignified burial. Before this most slaves were buried in unmarked graves in Cape Town's pauper burial sites.

The Emancipation of Slaves in the British Empire, which was implemented at the Cape in 1838, caused an influx of people to Cape Town in search of work, and this led to the growth of the Sendinggestig.

=== History of the SA Gestig Congregation ===
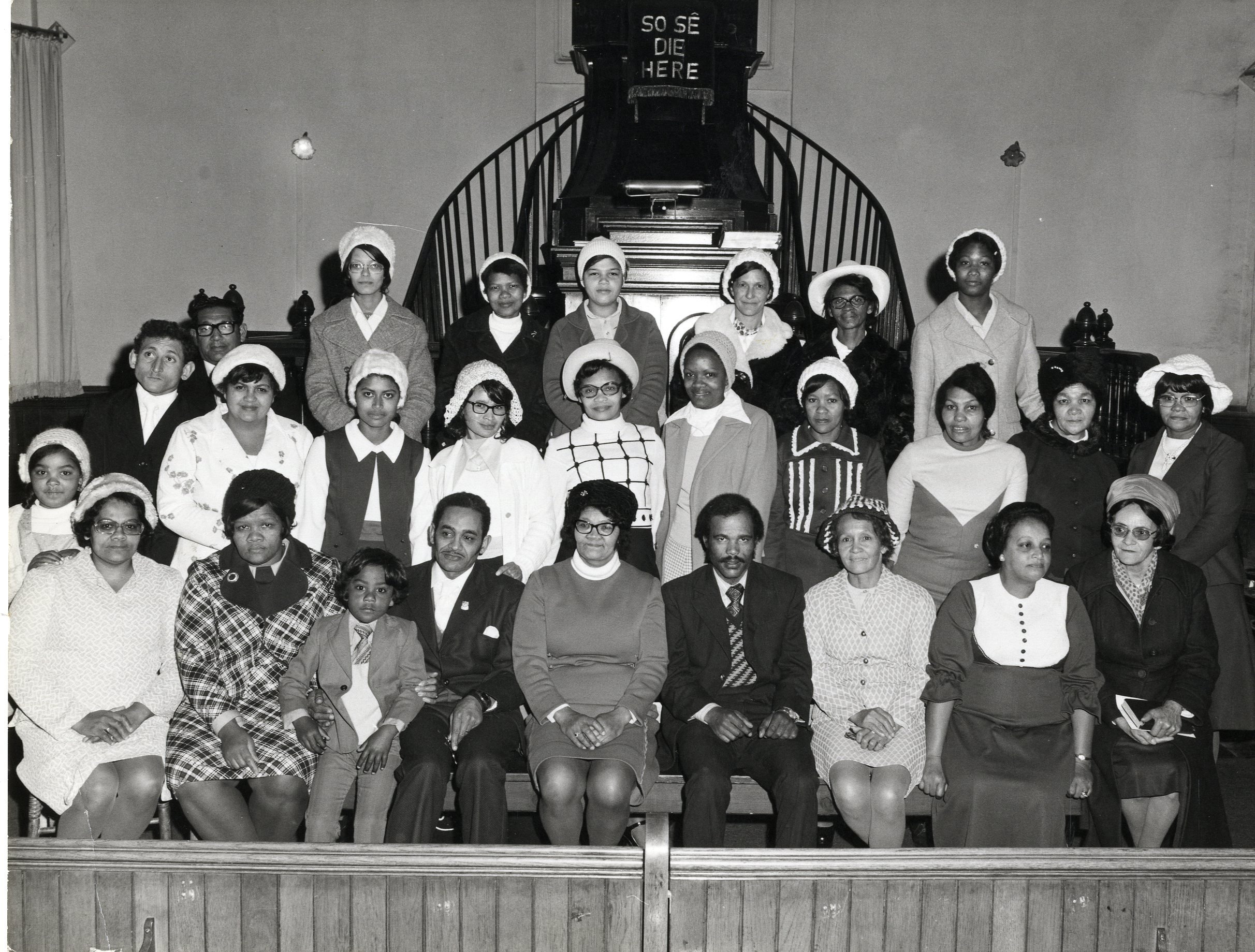
Members of the Congregation c. 1975

Slave-owners were not keen to have their slaves baptised, as Christian converts could not be sold. Mostly freed slaves were therefore baptised and could then become members of the Dutch Reformed Church in South Africa (NGK). This led to the directors of SA Mission Society establishing their own congregation. It was called the SA Gesticht congregation of the SA Missionary Society. In 1820 Jacobus Henricus Beck became its first minister.

On 24 December 1820 the first baptism was held at the Sendinggestig. Domingo, slave of Mr Hammes, Job, slave of Mr Stronck, Arend, slave of the widow Pauelsen and Durenda, slave of the widow Stegman, became the first members of the congregation.

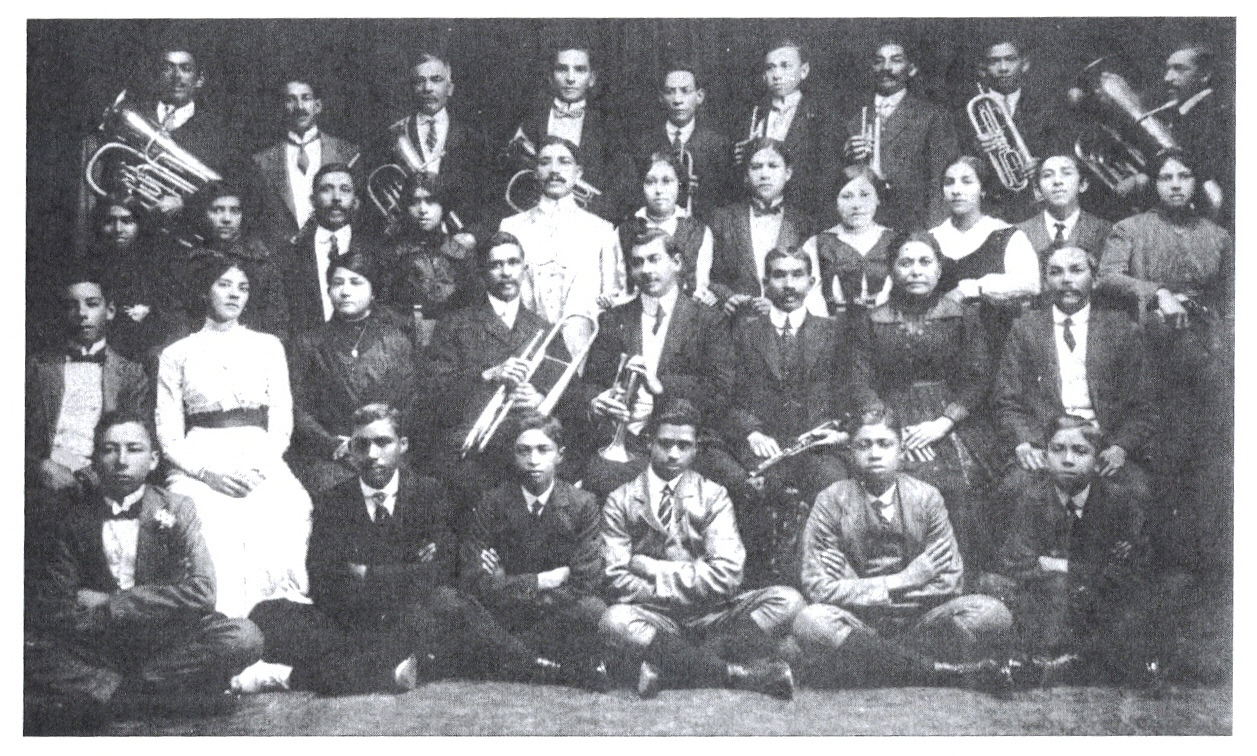
The Church Choir and Brass Band c. 1916

In 1831 the stable-building behind the church was converted into a small double-storeyed home for the church's caretaker.

The congregation began using the store next to the church as a school in 1839. This school would operate until 1917. The building was also used as a venue for the congregation's church bazaars. In 1895 the school was moved to the second storey and different businesses rented the ground floor as extra income for the congregation. During the 1930s it served as the office of the African People's Organisation.

By 1901 the SA Gestig congregation had 1,153 members. The congregation had a brass band and choir. Its members actively participated in a variety of associations including the Christian Sisters Association ("Christelijke Susterbond"), the Christian Young Daughters Association ("Christelijke Jongdogtersbond"), the Children's Association ("Kinderbond") and Youth Brigade ("Jeugbrigade").

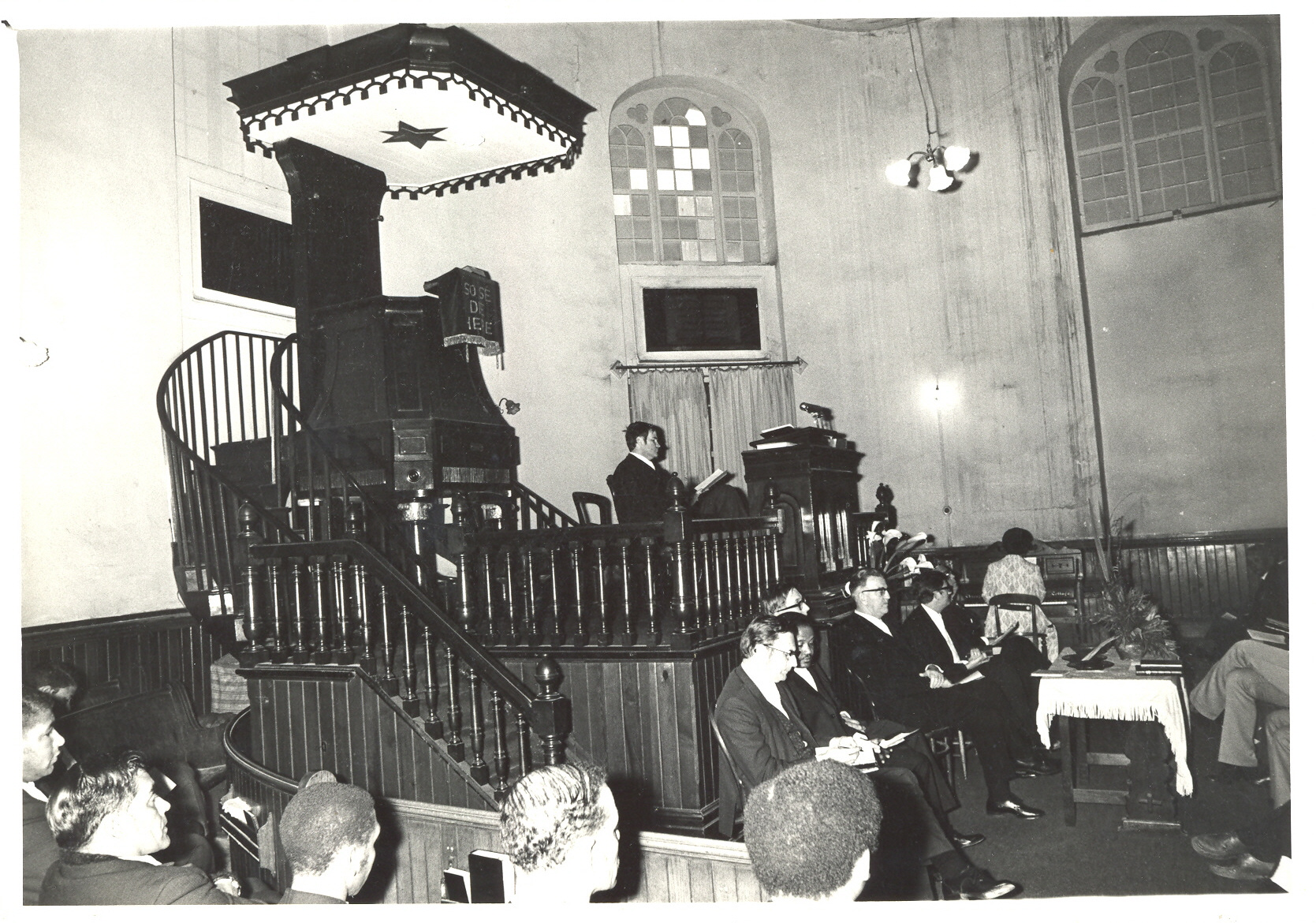
The final church service at the Sendinggestig in August 1975

From 1922 a well-known member of congregation, Anna Tempo (or Sister Nannie as she was commonly known), worked with women and girls living on Cape Town's streets. She established "Nannie Girls' Rescue Home" as a shelter for them.

During the 1930s the SA Gestig church became the spiritual home for domestic workers who came to Cape Town from different rural areas.

In 1937 the SA Gestig congregation became part of the Dutch Reformed Mission Church and was supported by the South African Missionary Society until its dissolution in 1983.

By 1954 only 520 members remained as people moved away to the suburbs to find work and due to urban racial segregation. Distance and economic circumstances made it difficult for members of the congregation to keep attending church in Cape Town.

By the end of the 1960s the buildings fell into disrepair, there were misunderstandings between the church council and directors of the SA Mission Society and uncertainty about the Group Areas Act. The church, old school and care-taker's home were all sold to the Metropolitan Hotel in 1971 with the provision that the congregation could use the church for another 5 years.

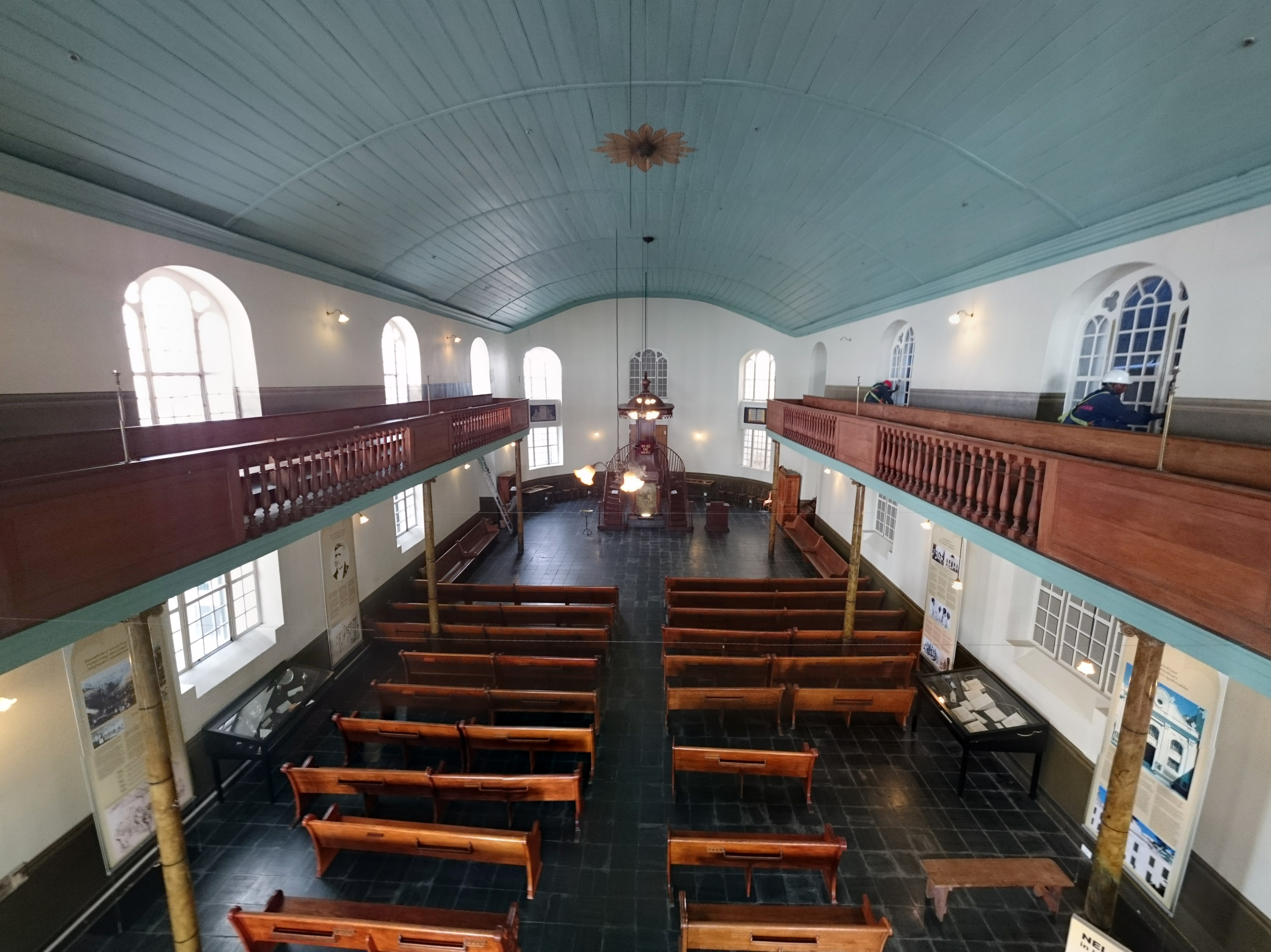
Sendinggestig Museum: interior

The SA Gestig congregation had to find a suitable piece of land for building a church in a "Coloured Group Area". Until their new church was completed in Belhar the congregation shared Cape Town's St Stephens Church from 1975 to 1978.

A special memorial service was held on 31 August 1975, during which the congregation bid farewell to their original church in Long Street.

The new church in Belhar was inaugurated in 1978. This would become the site where the Belhar Confession was produced.

=== Establishment as a museum ===
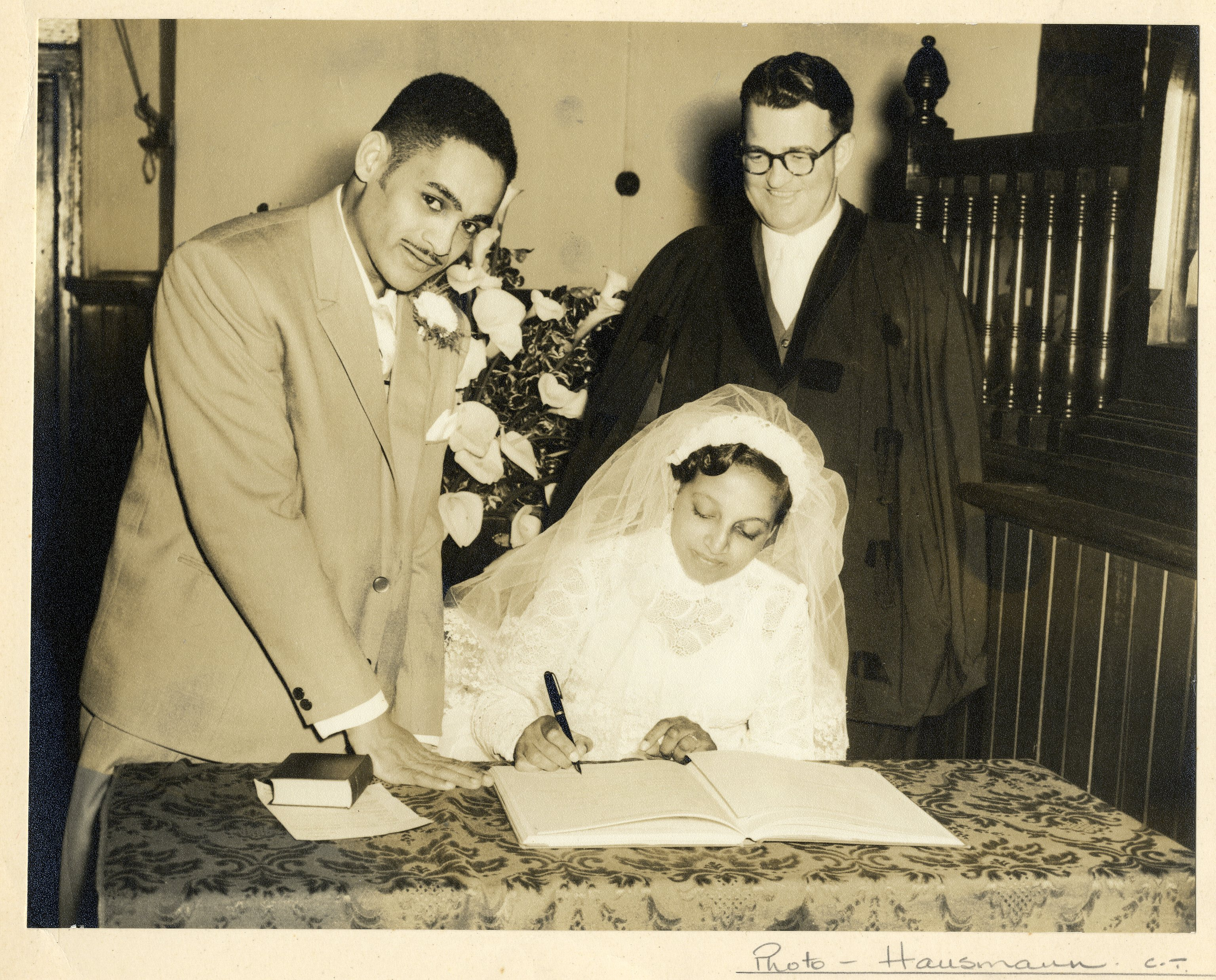
Reverend Van der Merwe Married the February Couple at the Sendinggestig in 1958

During the 1970s The S.A. Sendinggestig Museum was established as a result of an interest group advocating both saving the building and preserving the legacy of the Christian Missionaries in the then Cape Colony (Dutch). The building was then purchased with the intention of establishing a museum, funded by the then Provincial Administration of the Cape of Good Hope. Additional funding for this project was raised by the Simon van der Stel Foundation, a local heritage conservation body, and members of the public.

The SA Sendinggestig Museum opened its doors in March 1979.

== Function and themes ==
The theme of the museum is Christian missionaries and the impact the missionaries had on slaves and the indigenous people of South Africa. Exhibitions at the museum also carry themes about the history of the South African Gestig Congregation, the history of the museum building and Christian mission work and mission stations.

== Other Activities ==
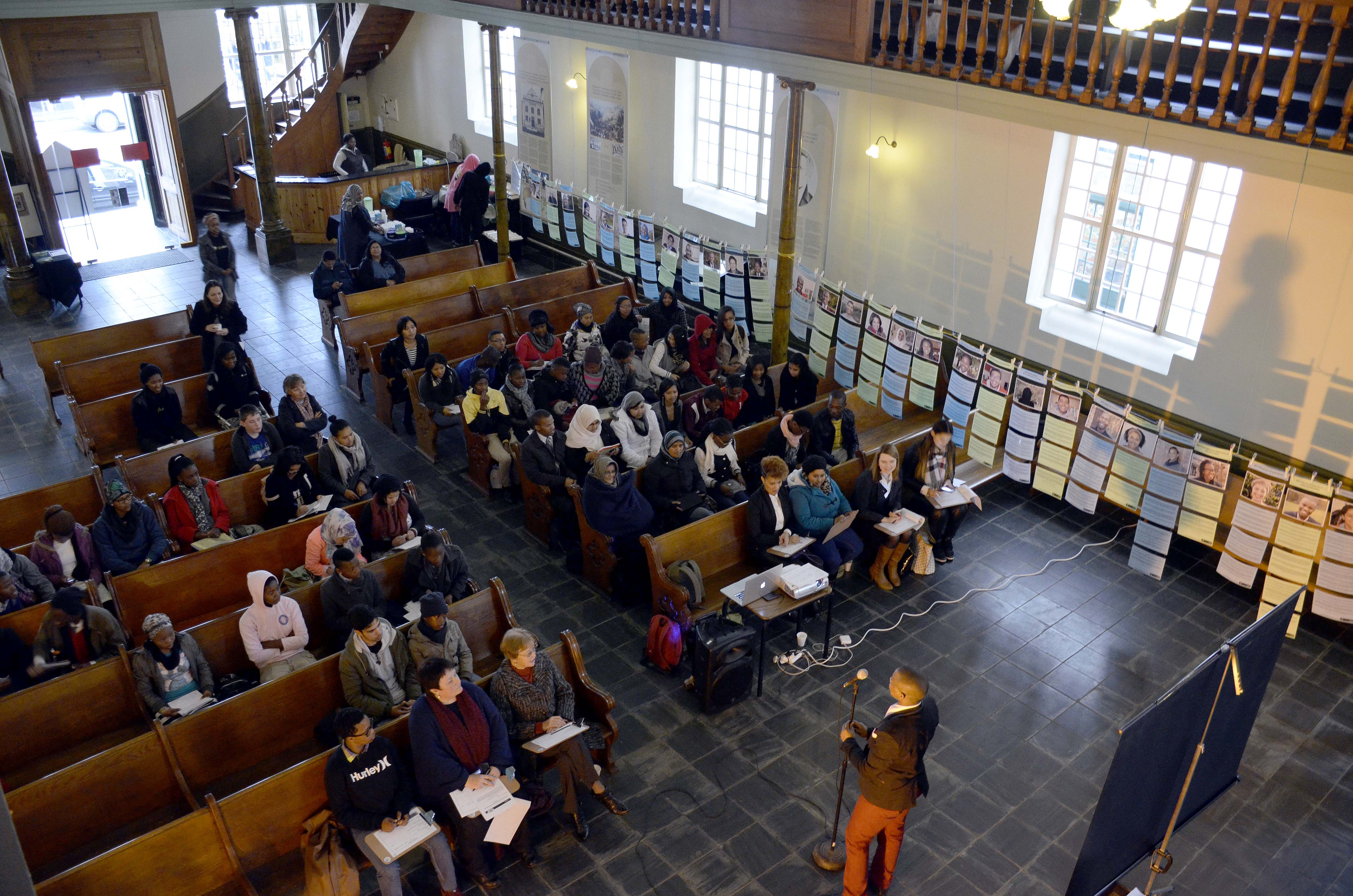
A youth event hosted at the museum

The former South Africa Gestig churchgoers, their families and museum staff members work together to ensure that the museum's content becomes more representative. In addition to this the museum hosts events aimed at young people and, via different communities, aiming to promote social inclusion and cohesion. The museum also hosts activities linked to South Africa's national days.
