= The Spear (painting) =

Satirical painting by Brett Murray

- Artist: Brett Murray
- Year: 2010
- Type: Acrylic on canvas
- Dimensions: 185 cm × 140 cm (72.8 in × 55 in)
- Location: Goodman Gallery, Johannesburg

The Spear is a 2010 painting by Cape Town-based South African artist Brett Murray. Put on public display in 2012, it depicts the then South African President Jacob Zuma, his genitals revealed, in a standing pose reminiscent of Russian revolutionary Vladimir Lenin. The painting triggered a defamation lawsuit by Zuma's party, the African National Congress (ANC).

The ANC's public condemnation of the painting and vandalism upon it brought widespread local and international attention to the painting, where otherwise it may have remained a relatively obscure piece of work.

== Exhibition ==
The painting was one of the pieces of artist Brett Murray's Hail to the Thief II exhibition in the Goodman Gallery in Johannesburg, which opened on 10 May 2012. Inspiration was drawn from the Russian artist Viktor Semyonovich Ivanov's poster Lenin Lived, Lenin Is Alive, Lenin Will Live. The exhibition features various pieces that are critical of South Africa's ruling party, the ANC, showcasing sculptures and images that suggest corruption and bad governance. Murray's works in the exhibition also include modifications of ANC liberation-struggle posters and flyers from the Apartheid era, some displaying the text "Amandla, we demand Chivas, BMWs and bribes".

== Public perception of Jacob Zuma ==
Zuma has often been the centre of scandal and ridicule, due to his polygamous lifestyle with many wives and girlfriends, and a comment he made during his 2006 rape trial that showering after sex would minimise the risk of contracting HIV. His lifestyle has made him the target of well-known cartoonist Zapiro, who frequently depicts Zuma with a shower on his head, ridiculing the statements he made during his trial. Zapiro was also sued for defamation by the ANC; Zuma ultimately dropped the suit in 2013. These public perceptions of Zuma provided part of the basis for Brett Murray's painting.

Zapiro added fuel to the fire by doing his own version of the painting, replacing the genitals with a showerhead. Another appeared two days later, ridiculing Zuma.

== ANC response ==
After a review and photo appeared in the City Press, Liza Essers, the owner and director of the Goodman Gallery, said that she received a telephone call from Mduduzi Mbata, special advisor to the minister of arts and culture, seeking to clarify her thoughts on the exhibition. She invited him to visit the gallery the following Tuesday.

The ANC issued a press release on 17 May 2012 expressing outrage over the painting and saying it would apply to the High Court to have it removed. Attorneys representing the ANC and Zuma repeated the threat in an email sent to Essers the same day. The painting drew strong condemnation from ANC leaders and various religious groups, who found the painting "obscene" and "vulgar". A leader of the Nazareth Baptist Church called for the artist to be stoned to death. The ANC also demanded that the image be taken down from the City Press' website. ANC spokesperson Jackson Mthembu said of the painting, "The African National Congress is extremely disturbed and outraged by the distasteful and indecent manner in which Brett Murray and the Goodman Gallery in Johannesburg is displaying the person of comrade President Jacob Zuma". Zuma responded to the artwork by saying that it painted him as "a philanderer and a womaniser".

In response to the impending legal action, gallery spokesperson Lara Koseff said its lawyers had responded that it would stay until the show was over, citing censorship concerns as central to the decision to allow the exhibition to continue. The ANC Women's League has also demanded that the exhibition be halted, and all instances of the image be removed from the internet. Brett Murray said that his painting had not been intended maliciously, but as "an attempt at humorous satire of political power and patriarchy within the context of other artworks in the exhibition and within the broader context of South African discourse".

In the first day of legal proceedings, the representative for the ANC, Gcina Malindi, began sobbing and was unable to proceed, causing the process to be adjourned and postponed and the television coverage of the event was suppressed. Later, the ANC sought to drop proceedings.

=== Consequences ===
The ANC's public condemnation of the painting brought widespread local and international attention to the painting, where otherwise it may have remained a relatively obscure piece of work. For this reason, the action and subsequent fall-out has been characterised as an example of the Streisand effect. Subsequently, The Spear has been featured in editorials and news features in all forms of traditional and digital media.

Former ANC leader Oliver Tambo's daughter Tselane Tambo was of the opinion that Zuma deserved Murray's portrayal of him. She wrote on a social networking site, "Do the poor enjoy poverty? Do the unemployed enjoy hopelessness? Do those who can’t get housing enjoy homelessness? He must get over it. No one is having a good time. He should inspire the reverence he craves. This portrait is what he inspired. Shame neh!”.

The media boycott of City Press by the ANC and various public figures led to the newspaper eventually removing the painting from its website on 28 May 2012.

=== Media boycott ===
After City Press repeatedly refused to remove an image of the painting from their website, the ANC called upon its members and sympathisers to boycott placing advertising in, and buying of, the weekly paper. A statement released by the ANC said: "Their refusal to remove this portrait from their website and their controlled social media is a clear indication that this newspaper does not belong to our shared democratic dispensation and values." Responding to the boycott, City Press editor-in-chief Ferial Haffajee described Nzimande's call for a boycott of the paper as "deeply disturbing".

The ANC was criticised by the South African National Editors' Forum (SANEF), which said "While we recognise the right of the ANC to advise members on how to exercise their consumer decisions, the call for a boycott of a newspaper is tantamount to intimidation and abuse of power ... This kind of behaviour is unbecoming of a party that functions in an open democratic stage and especially one which leads the national government." The boycott of City Press was further condemned by the International Press Institute (IPI), and by 28 May, ten days after the newspaper printed the painting for the first time, opinions in the ANC had divided with several senior members opposing the boycott.

== Defacement ==
On the morning of 22 May 2012, two men entered the gallery during visiting hours and defaced the painting - first by painting a red cross over the depiction of Zuma's face and genitals and then by smearing black paint over the canvas. The two – Barend la Grange and Lowie Mabokela – were arrested. Court proceedings brought by the ANC were under way.

== Classification ==
On 22 May 2012, the Film and Publication Board (FPB) of South Africa announced that a team of five classifiers had been sent to assess The Spear, following specific complaints to the FPB, which is the statutory body responsible for classifying, and applying age ratings and content advisories to, works published or distributed in South Africa, including films, computer games, images of all kinds, and printed publications; however, "Only pornographic publications need to be passed by the FPB before they are released on the market" while others are considered based on "complaints received from the public regarding specific publications", and the FPB's jurisdiction specifically excludes newspapers and the broadcast media, which are regulated by separate entities. For this reason, the FPB proceedings could only consider the painting itself, its display by the gallery, and its publication or possible publication on websites or in other venues subject to FPB jurisdiction; and could not address the publication of images of it by newspapers or broadcasters. During the classification proceedings, there were allegations that the FPB was acting outside its statutory remit, and that specific members had made statements or asked questions implying that it was entitled to censor political opinions and restrict freedom of the press.

On 1 June 2012, the FPB announced that the classifiers assigned to 'The Spear' had rejected a complainant's call for the painting to be rated X18 (placing it within the category of legal pornographic works that must "be passed by the FPB before they are released on the market", and that may be distributed only by licensed distributors, who are required to obtain proof of age), but had decided on a 16N rating for the original, undefaced and uncensored, painting, meaning that measures should be put in place to prevent access to it and to images of it by those under the age of sixteen, and to advise "sensitive adult viewers" over sixteen that it contains nudity (but not explicit sexual content, which would have been designated by an S in the rating). In its press statement announcing the classification, the FPB referred at length to its statutory authority and responsibilities, in particular its role in "promoting the safety of children"; and explicitly denied that it had been influenced by political figures or had acted beyond its jurisdiction, saying that "We believe that reports to the contrary have been specifically designed to defame the Film and Publication Board, question its integrity, competence, credibility as well as formulate as a reality the false notion that the state seeks to silence and censor the media by all means possible and with total disregard for accepted procedures and principles". In reply to questions, FPB chief operations officer Mmapula Fisha said that The Spear differed from other works of art containing nudity, and merited the 16N classification, because "The artwork has forced society to revisit its painful history".

On 10 October 2012, the FPB announced that the Film and Publication Appeal Tribunal had upheld the Goodman Gallery's appeal, setting aside the classification and thereby removing all restrictions on publication of and access to the painting. The tribunal's full ruling was published on the same day.

The Appeal Tribunal approved the original Classification Committee's determination that The Spear should not be classed as pornography, but found against the committee, its procedure, and its classification on several grounds.

== See also ==
- Barack Obama "Hope" poster, with similar use of colours
- Mirth & Girth, a comparable depiction of a Chicago politician
