= Mirth & Girth =

Painting by David K. Nelson

- Artist: David K. Nelson
- Year: 1988
- Medium: Acrylic on canvas
- Dimensions: 122 cm × 91 cm (48 in × 36 in)
- Location: SAIC, Chicago, IL, U.S.A.

Mirth & Girth is a portrait painting by School of the Art Institute of Chicago (SAIC) student David K. Nelson, Jr., depicting the popular late African-American mayor of Chicago Harold Washington wearing only a bra, G-string, garter belt and stockings. After a brief showing at a May 11, 1988 private student exhibition in the Art Institute, angry African-American aldermen, including Ald. Allan Streeter, Ald. Bobby Rush and Ald. Dorothy Tillman, arrived with Chicago Police Department officers and confiscated the painting, triggering a First Amendment and race relations crisis and a civil lawsuit.

Free speech advocates condemned the seizure of the painting, while the aldermen maintained that the painting was an insult to Washington and should have been taken down. Some students at the SAIC showed their support for free speech by holding rallies in front of the school and at the Richard J. Daley Plaza, while other students criticized Nelson for poor timing in showing a racially insensitive image.

At some point between when the painting was confiscated and when it was returned, a 5-inch (13 cm) gash was made on the canvas. Nelson filed a federal lawsuit against the city, claiming that the painting's confiscation and subsequent damaging violated his First Amendment rights. He and the American Civil Liberties Union (ACLU) settled with the city for $95,000 (1994; equivalent to $206,000 in 2025) in compensation for the damaged painting after the United States Court of Appeals for the Seventh Circuit upheld the lower court's decision.

== Background ==
=== Harold Washington ===
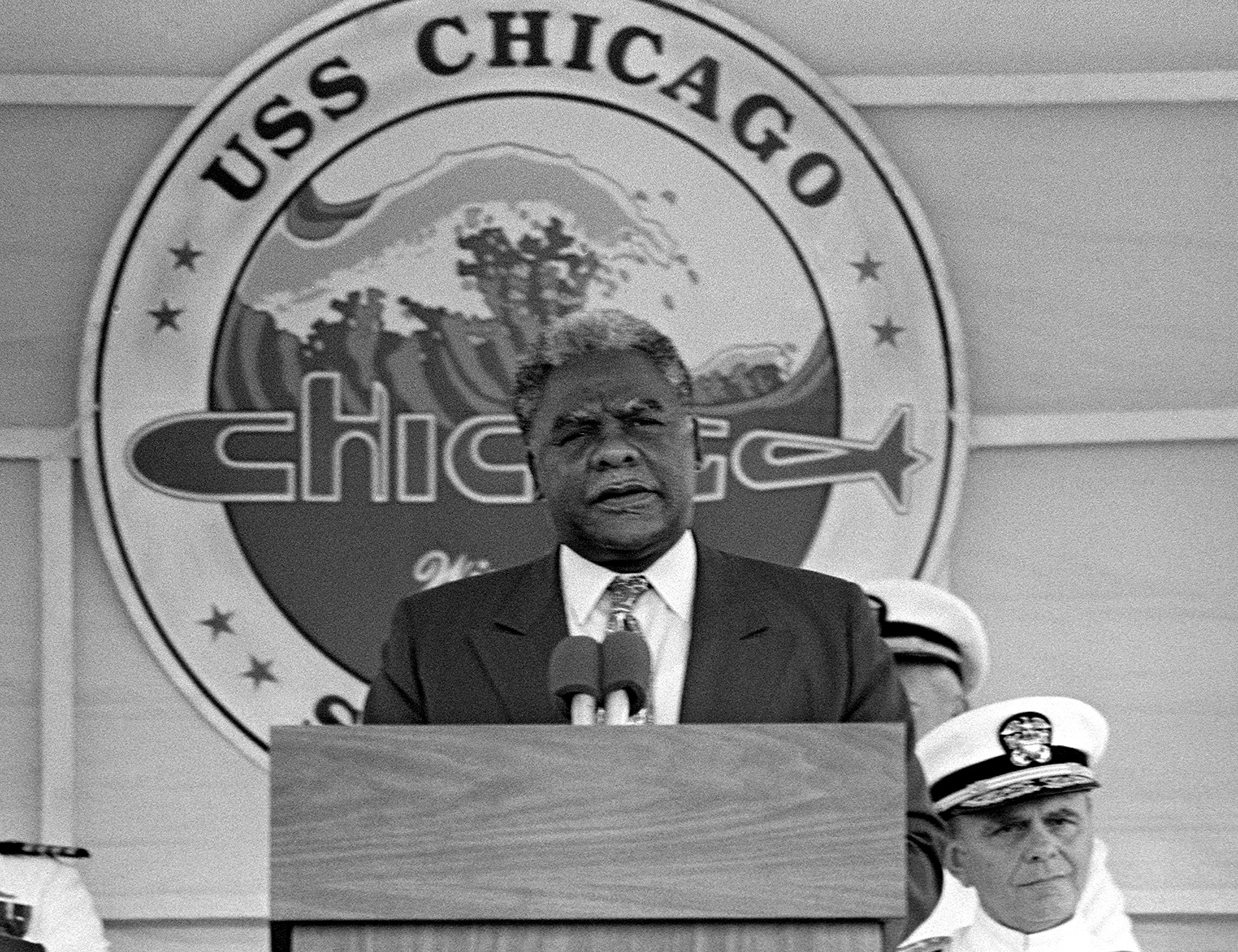
Harold Washington speaking at the commissioning of USS Chicago (SSN-721) in 1986

Harold Washington, the subject of the portrait, was elected in 1965 to the Illinois House of Representatives. Washington won Chicago's 1983 Democratic mayoral primary election, defeating Jane Byrne and Richard M. Daley. He was then elected mayor, prevailing over Bernard Epton in a racially polarizing general election. His first four-year term was characterized by the Council Wars, a period of political conflict with the mostly white aldermanic majority in City Council. Seven Washington-backed aldermanic challengers prevailed in the April, 1986 special municipal election, facilitating progress with Washington's agenda. Washington died suddenly of a heart attack in his office. His death was followed by a period of mourning by Chicagoans, particularly in the African-American community.

=== Creation of painting ===
Shortly after Washington's death, Nelson (who is white) painted Mirth & Girth, a "full-length frontal portrait of a portly grim-faced Harold Washington clad in a white bra and G-string, garter belt, and stockings". The painting was approximately 4 feet (122 cm) tall by 3 feet (91 cm) wide. In the portrait, Washington is holding a pencil in his right hand. His aide, Alton Miller, initially mistook Washington's slumping over his desk as an attempt to pick up a pencil that had fallen onto the floor. The title of the piece is presumably derived from Girth & Mirth, an organization for overweight gay men.

In an interview with the Chicago Sun-Times, Nelson stated that he had painted Mirth & Girth over the course of one night, standing in his underwear. He said that he had painted it in response to how the city populace revered Washington shortly after his death. Nelson stated, "(i)n Chicago, at this time, Harold Washington is like an icon. He's like a deity." In particular, Nelson painted the portrait after seeing prints of "Worry Ye Not", another poster that depicted a smiling Washington with a blue-robe adorned Jesus Christ, looking down on the Chicago skyline. Nelson later testified that he had based the iconoclastic elements of the painting on a rumor that doctors at Northwestern Memorial Hospital had discovered female underwear beneath the suit Washington was wearing at the time of his death. Three weeks after the controversy erupted, in an interview with the New Art Examiner, Nelson explained that the portrait referenced an existing photograph of Washington holding a cigarette prop at an American Cancer Society event.

The caricature was not Nelson's first. He had drawn a portrait of his mother as Whistler's Mother for Mother's Day. Nelson had also drawn a caricature of his father as the model depicted on boxes of Cream of Wheat. Nelson explained, "(t)his kind of irreverence and iconoclasm runs through all my artwork". In an April Fools' Day edition of a Weekly World News parody produced by Nelson, he illustrated SAIC president Anthony Jones as an infant in the arms of a bare-breasted Madonna.

== Display and confiscation ==
=== Initial display ===
On May 11, 1988, Mirth & Girth was displayed at a private exhibition in one of the school's main interior hallways. The painting was part of a set of six that Nelson was displaying in a judged three-day student fellowship exhibition held to showcase upcoming graduates. Another of his works was a self-portrait titled "I'm Sensitive, and I Love All Humanity", depicting Nelson holding little people of multiple nationalities. As soon as the exhibit opened, between 7:30 and 8:30 am, the painting drew enough negative attention for the Art Institute to post a security guard in front of the painting. Shortly thereafter, the school began to receive angry phone calls about the painting.

Soon after the exhibit opened, word of the controversy reached the Chicago City Council, which was in session. Alderman Bobby Rush (then of the 2nd ward) immediately put together a resolution that would cut off the city's contribution to the Art Institute unless it apologized for displaying the painting. In part, the resolution read "Whereas, the artist David Nelson obviously exhibits some type of demented and pathological mental capacities ...". Another resolution was written that asked the Art Institute to remove the painting immediately. After passing both items, a group of aldermen left to deliver the resolutions to the Art Institute.

Nelson returned to the painting about an hour after it was first displayed. He had forgotten a hammer and nails to hang the painting, and had left it leaning against the wall for an hour. Shortly after he returned, city aldermen, police officers and local reporters arrived at the scene, leading to a dramatic confrontation between aldermen and other students, while Nelson remained incognito nearby.

=== Confiscation ===
Aldermen Edward Jones (20th) and William C. Henry (24th) were the first aldermen to arrive from the City Council session. According to the federal lawsuit, Henry showed he had a gun, and then with Jones removed the now-hung painting from the wall and placed it on the floor, facing the wall. After they left, another student rehung the painting. Three other aldermen, Allan Streeter (17th), Dorothy Tillman (3rd) and Rush, arrived later. They took down the painting and attempted to remove it from the school, but were stopped by a school official. The aldermen then took the painting to the office of the school president Anthony Jones (no relation to Edward Jones). The painting had a 5 in (13 cm) gash, and it had been wrapped in brown paper.

Alderman Tillman threatened to burn the painting in President Jones' office, but a Chicago Police Department (CPD) lieutenant present with the aldermen, Lt. Raymond Patterson, advised against this. Instead, another unnamed alderman called CPD superintendent Leroy Martin. Martin telephoned Patterson in Jones' office and ordered Patterson to take the painting into police custody, telling Jones that the painting amounted to "incitement to riot". Patterson overrode this direct order, citing his own powers as the lieutenant on the scene and hung up on Martin. A CPD sergeant accompanied Rush, Streeter and Tillman to a waiting police car with the wrapped painting in hand. Parts of the incident were later broadcast on television.

The incident was marked by a volatile shouting match between the aldermen and students, and met with condemnation from free-speech advocates. As the aldermen escorted the painting to the police vehicle, a mass of students outside of the Art Institute jeered them, naming the aldermen "commies", "fascists", "brownshirts" and "philistines". Seventeen bomb threats were recorded at the school after the controversy erupted.

== Responses ==
=== African-American community ===
Shortly after the incident, a black alderman told reporters that he believed the painting was the work of a Jewish artist. Nelson replied through a Chicago Tribune story that he "is not Jewish". The remark was made in part because racial tensions had already been elevated a week earlier after the firing of Steve Cokely, a mayoral aide, by African-American mayor and Harold Washington's successor Eugene Sawyer. Cokely had accused Jews of "engaging in an international conspiracy for world control". His firing caused a rift in segments of the black community, leading some to believe that Sawyer was also involved in the same conspiracy.

There is a moral responsibility here that transcends, as far as I'm concerned, transcends the courts, transcends the First Amendment.

— Allan Streeter, 17th Ward Alderman

In a New York Times article published on May 13, 1988, Alderman Streeter reiterated his stance regarding the removal of the painting, saying that he would have "gone to jail to get that painting down", calling it "an insult to a great man and an affront to blacks". On May 16, 1988, Streeter appeared on the local public television station news program Chicago Tonight. He reinforced that Nelson had abdicated his "responsibility to his constituency" to "do what is right". In the segment, he reaffirmed that he believed the aldermen had "a law, the law of common sense, the law of morality, the law of decency [that] transcends the First Amendment".

The Art Institute has long been a closed bastion of white male Western cultural supremacy.

— James A. Brame, president of the Illinois Alliance of Black Student Organizations

Operation PUSH, an organization that pursues social justice and civil rights, threatened to impose "sanctions" on the Art Institute unless the Art Institute acted to prevent offensive portraits from being shown by students or contributing artists in the future. Separately, the Illinois Alliance of Black Student Organizations called for racial parity with regards to faculty and student enrollment within the school. African-American students alleged that there was an underlying attitude of racism at the school, while other black students distributed a flyer listing incidents of theft and advice given to foreign students about socializing with blacks. By contrast, another white graduate noted that school officials looked at students' slides and paintings without knowing the race of the student. The school noted that 236 of its 1,312 undergraduate students were minorities, a higher percentage than comparable private professional art schools.

On February 12, 1994, during a rally to raise money for the defendants' mounting legal bills, Nation of Islam leader Louis Farrakhan supported the three aldermen's right to seize the painting, calling it "an act of righteous indignation". Farrakhan referred to Washington as "a father figure for black people", and described the painting and subsequent lawsuit "a total disrespect for our feelings and our community".

=== Free speech advocates ===
If there was a threat, the way to prevent a riot would have been to protect the painting and arrest the rioters and hecklers. What they did was arrest the painting.

— Jay Miller, executive director for the ACLU

On May 12, 1988, representatives from the American Civil Liberties Union (ACLU) picked up the painting and returned it to Nelson. Jay Miller, another representative for the ACLU, described the incident as "vigilante stuff", noting that the action "was done in the name of one of the great civil libertarians of our time. Harold Washington had a 100 percent voting record in Congress and in the state Legislature on issues of civil liberties and civil rights." In 1984 Washington had supported the civil rights of sculptor John Sefick after Sefick had created a satirical statue of Washington. By comparison, former mayor Michael Bilandic had ordered a Sefick statue satirizing his handling of Chicago's crippling Blizzard of 1979 covered by a blanket, a decision that was later overturned in federal court.

Students from the SAIC protested on Columbus Drive the next day, holding signs that asked drivers to "honk for free speech". Student leaders began to consult attorneys to file a lawsuit against the Chicago Police Department and the aldermen. Other groups of students planned a "be-in" at the Richard J. Daley Plaza, but it was canceled after the students learned other groups might cause a confrontation. Some students felt that the school had been a victim of racial politics, and that the incident would be used to censor the Art Institute.

On Chicago Tonight, Daniel Polsby, a law professor at Northwestern University, cited federal statutes violated during the confiscation of the portrait. He then faulted Marshall Field's reluctance to defend the First Amendment, further comparing the seizure of Mirth & Girth to then-Arkansas governor Orval Faubus' refusal to abide by the First Amendment and allow minorities to enroll in Little Rock Central High School. According to Polsby, Faubus' rationale at the time was to preserve a delicate civil rights situation. Polsby called the aldermen's action "crushingly ironic and terribly sad".

=== Reactions within the SAIC ===
At the SAIC, students' characterizations of the painting ranged from political caricature, to "whimsy", to a commercial success. One student noted that Nelson was "known nationally now, which is every artist's dream". Another student noted that "(a)rtists have to be responsible for what they make, and this guy is not being responsible". In a meeting with 100 students after the incident, Anthony Jones, then-president of the SAIC, assured the students that he stood behind their First Amendment rights. Regarding the painting, Jones said that the painting was in poor taste and should not have been displayed.

We understand students have First Amendment rights, but we do not condone or support the use of the First Amendment to disparage the memory of an important leader like the late Mayor Harold Washington.

— Marshall Field, Chairman of the Art Institute of Chicago

Members of the Art Institute Board met the day after the incident and agreed not to display Mirth & Girth any further. Chairman Marshall Field also issued a formal apology for displaying the painting and agreed to consider demands that the school both hire more black administrators and accept more black students. Field also published the apology in each of the city's daily metropolitan newspapers. After the apology was issued, Polsby strongly criticized Field's refusal to more aggressively stand up for the students' First Amendment rights.

=== Other reactions ===
Members of the Council of Religious Leaders of Metropolitan Chicago, which included leaders from mainline Protestant, Roman Catholic and Jewish organizations from the city, issued a statement that expressed "moral dismay" over the painting. They further added that the display of the painting showed "a lack of sensitivity which we could have expected from those who were responsible for its showing".

As for the painting's critical reception, one local art reviewer mentioned that "the only thing [the SAIC] might have felt sheepish about was not having a staff that in four years could instill in Nelson a better grasp of figure painting". In a newspaper interview, Nelson responded that the criticism was "the one thing that did make me kind of angry. I don't think the painting was poorly executed, though it wasn't my favorite painting." In his book Arresting Images — Impolitic Art and Uncivil Actions, Stephen C. Dubin suggested that the painting represented a symbolic castration of Washington, reflecting more "traditional" reactions to African-Americans in positions of power.

Nelson gave only a few interviews before leaving Chicago for the suburbs, and then Graceland to avoid the press. On the advice of his friends, Nelson stayed away from his graduation ceremony on May 14, 1988. He turned down a $15,000 (1988, equivalent to $41,000 in 2025) offer for the painting, calling it a "grossly inflated" price. He also turned down a separate opportunity to appear on Phil Donahue's syndicated talk show, saying that he never watched the show and was genuinely uninterested in the offer. Nelson's views were expressed by Harvey Grossman, the legal director for the ACLU. Through Grossman, Nelson said he would not press for the returning of the painting, as it had fulfilled its purpose of "drawing attention to his 'iconoclastic' work".

== Nelson v. Streeter ==
On June 23, 1988, the ACLU filed a federal lawsuit on behalf of Nelson against the three aldermen who were seen on television handling the painting. It claimed the removal of the painting violated Nelson's First Amendment right to freedom of expression, Fourth Amendment right to protection from unreasonable seizures, and Fourteenth amendment right against being deprived of property without a hearing. The ACLU sought $100,000 (1988, equivalent to $272,000 in 2025) to compensate Nelson for damage to the painting, and to "punish" the aldermen and police for their actions.

Ald. Robert Shaw (9th) called the suit "a slap in the face to the black community". Rush questioned the motive of the suit, as himself, Tillman and Streeter all were supporters of Alderman Timothy C. Evans (17th), a political rival of mayor Eugene Sawyer. Rush specifically called the suit "frivolous" and "impetuous", openly questioning whether the ACLU had filed the suit to enhance fundraising activities or for other political reasons.

The City of Chicago refused in February 1990 to pay mounting legal costs for the aldermen. The aldermen argued that they were performing their official duties "in protecting the security of the city during the turmoil created by the exhibit" when they removed the painting. The city contended that the aldermen had taken the action as individuals. Nelson refused a $10,000 (1990, equivalent to $25,000 in 2025) settlement at the time.

On August 11, 1992, U.S. District Judge George Lindberg dismissed the City of Chicago from the lawsuit, but ruled that Superintendent Martin must go to trial and that the three aldermen violated Nelson's civil rights. Lindberg supported the recommendations regarding that issue Magistrate Judge Elaine Bucklo's had made in March 1992. Tillman's lawyer, James Chapman, recommended to Tillman that an immediate appeal be filed in federal court.

So we must ask whether in 1988 the law was clear that local government officials may not go onto private property without invitation (the aldermen had not been invited to the exhibition of student work), seize a painting that they do not like because it vilifies a public official with whom they had been associated, and wrap it in brown paper and remove it so that no one can see it. To ask the question is pretty much to answer it. As Chief Justice Warren said in another case involving an effort to suppress public criticism of a mayor of Chicago, "This is a simple case."

— Judge Richard Posner, Chief Judge of the U.S. Court of Appeals for the Seventh Circuit

=== Appellate court ===
In the appeal, decided February 1, 1994, judges Richard Posner, Frank H. Easterbrook, and Michael Stephen Kanne affirmed Lindberg's earlier decision. Writing for the court, Posner rejected claims of official immunity and said city officials had no right to enter private property and take "offensive" paintings off its walls. He also rejected the argument that removing paintings from walls was an official duty.

Posner also rejected the argument that the defendants were removing the painting to save Chicago from racial riots that the continued showing of the painting might have started, and in which it might have been destroyed. He found that Tillman herself threatened to burn the painting on the spot, and that there was no mob. In addition, the court found that because Nelson had not intended to provoke a riot, the First Amendment could still be used to protect his speech.

The appellate court also faulted the district judge for allowing "more than a year and a half elapsed before the filing and disposition of the motions for summary judgment". Posner noted in his opinion that "the governing principles are clear, the facts have been explored exhaustively, and the defendants should be aware that efforts to mount a last-ditch, no-holds-barred defense may simply increase their liability for the plaintiff's attorney's fees under 42 U.S.C. § 1988." He then affirmed the district court's decision.

=== Settlement and aftermath ===
On September 20, 1994, the city and the ACLU reached a settlement. The ACLU agreed to drop claims against the city and Superintendent LeRoy Martin. In return, the city of Chicago agreed to pay Nelson and the ACLU $95,000 (1994, equivalent to $206,000 in 2025) for damage to the painting and to issue police procedures about what materials protected by the First Amendment may be seized. The elected officials also agreed not to appeal the district court's ruling. Left unresolved were the hundreds of thousands of dollars of legal fees owed to lawyers defending Tillman, Rush and Streeter; by September 1994, $200,000 (1994, equivalent to $434,000 in 2025) in fees were owed by Tillman alone. Earlier in the year, the City Council's Finance Committee voted against paying for the aldermen's legal fees. The vote split along racial lines, 12 to 8.

Grossman stated that the relatively small settlement showed that Nelson had proceeded with the lawsuit "on a matter of principle". Tillman, however, called the settlement a "great victory", saying, "we didn't admit to anything, all the charges were dropped, we're not paying anything (in damages), and we preserve our rights to pursue efforts to have our legal fees paid". At the time the lawsuit was settled, Nelson did not issue any statements. The Chicago Tribune reported that he was employed as an advertising artist at an undisclosed firm; he continued to paint in his free time. As of 1994, the painting had not been sold, exhibited, or repaired after the incident.

== See also ==
- The Spear (painting)
