= Films and Publications Act, 1996 =

Parliament of South Africa
- Long title: Act to provide for the classification of certain films and publications; to that end to provide for the establishment of a Film and Publication Board and a Film and Publication Review Board; to repeal certain laws; and to provide for matters connected therewith.
- Citation: Act No. 65 of 1996
- Enacted by: Parliament of South Africa
- Assented to: 30 October 1996
- Commenced: 1 June 1998

Amended by
- Films and Publications Amendment Acts, 1999, 2004 and 2009; Prevention and Combating of Corrupt Activities Act, 2004
- Status: In force

The Films and Publications Act, 1996 is an act of the South African Parliament.

The act repealed a number of acts of prior legislation which censored literary and media works under that country's previous apartheid government.

It established a Film and Publication Board and Review Board. The Board's function would be to receive complaints, or applications to evaluate, a film or publication, to classify it according to its suitability for different audiences.
