= Sanell Aggenbach =

South African artist (born 1975)

- Born: 1975 (age 50–51)
- Education: BA in Fine Art, University of Stellenbosch 1997
- Known for: Painting, Sculpture, Printmaking
- Spouse: Brett Murray
- Awards: 2003 Absa L'Atelier; UNESCO-Aschberg Residency
- Website: www.sanellaggenbach.com

Sanell Aggenbach (born 1975) is a South African artist living and working in Woodstock, Cape Town. Using painting, printmaking, and sculpture, her work addresses the relationship between history and private narratives, with a sense of ambiguity. Her work also explores the processes of nostalgia and historical myth-making, often incorporating the playful, disarming, and absurd to draw the viewer into discussions of darker subjects. She has a unique style of combining traditional painting techniques with sculptural elements, as well as typically feminine crafts such as sewing and tapestry.

== Career ==
Aggenbach graduated from the University of Stellenbosch in 1997 with a bachelor's degree in Fine Arts. Although now a full-time artist, Aggenbach was a lecturer from June 2000– March 2004 at the Cape College in Graphic Processes, Two-Dimensional Design and Drawing. Her work is represented in the Spier Collection, Anglo Gold South Africa, Sasol Art Museum, the Sasol Collection, and the Hollard Collection.

=== Solo exhibitions ===
- 2013: 'Familia Obscura', Brundyn +, Cape Town
- 2011: 'Some Dance to Remember Some Dance to Forget', Blank Projects, Cape Town
- 2009: 'Graceland', Gallery AOP, Johannesburg
- 2008: ' Sub Rosa', João Ferreira Gallery, Cape Town
- 2007: 'Perfectly Still', Absa Gallery, Johannesburg
- 2006: 'Blues and Greys', Art on Paper Gallery, Johannesburg
- 2005: 'Fool's Gold', Bell-Roberts Contemporary, Cape Town
- 2005: 'Hoogwater/High Tide', KKNK, Oudtshoorn
- 2003: 'Blank', AVA Gallery, Cape Town
- 2001: 'From a Netherworld', Bell-Roberts Gallery, Cape Town
- 2000: 'Northern Ladies', Art Konsult, New Delhi, India
- 1998: 'An Imitator', AVA Metropolitan Gallery, Cape Town

=== Group exhibitions ===
- 2011: 'Alptraum', Deutscher Kuenstlerbund, Berlin, Germany
- 2010: 'Twenty', contemporary public sculpture, Nirox, Johannesburg
- 2008: 'Print '08: Myth, Memory and Archive', Bell-Roberts Gallery, Cape Town
- 2007: 'Arcadia', AVA Gallery, Cape Town
- 2007: 'Turbulence', Hangar-7, Salzburg, Austria
- 2007: Spier Contemporary, Stellenbosch
- 2006: '20 Artists 06'. Contemporary printing, Bell-Roberts Gallery, Cape Town
- 2005: 'Sweet Nothings', new photographic work, Bell-Roberts Gallery, Cape Town
- 2004: '40 Years', University of Stellenbosch, Sasol Art Museum
- 2004: '2nd Spier Outdoor Sculpture Biennial', Stellenbosch
- 2003: 'Picnic', Bell-Roberts Gallery, Cape Town
- 2003: Brett Kebble Art Awards
- 2003: 'ABSA L'Atelier', Johannesburg
- 2003: 'YDESIRE', Castle of Good Hope, Cape Town
- 2002: 'Autogeographie', Millennium Gallery, Johannesburg
- 2002: 'Spier Outdoor Sculpture Biennial', Jan Marais Nature Reserve, Stellenbosch
- 2001: 'Micro/Macro', South African Printmakers at the Xchanges Gallery, Victoria, British Columbia (Canada)
- 2001: 'ABSA L'Atelier', Johannesburg.
- 2001: 'Aarsel/ Waver', KKNK, Oudshoorn

== Notable works ==
=== Some Dance To Remember Some Dance To Forget ===
A 2011 series of monotype prints that pay tribute to iconic images and albums from rock music history. Through these prints, Aggenbach offers a critique of African er identity, focusing on the generation inspired by the post-punk musicians.

=== Graceland ===
A 2009 exhibition at Gallery AOP inspired by a trip to Elvis's home in Memphis, Tennessee, exploring what it means to be Afrikaans.

=== Sub Rosa ===
A 2008 body of work referencing tampered photographic film, which blurs the distinction between the imagined accuracy of photography and the inaccurate or misleading nature of painting.
