= Brett Murray =

South African artist (born 1961)

- Born: 1961 (age 64–65); Pretoria, South Africa
- Education: University of Cape Town
- Known for: Pop art
- Spouse: Sanell Aggenbach
- Awards: Nominated as the Standard Bank Young Artist of the year in 2002
- Website: www.brettmurray.co.za

Brett Murray (born 1961) is a South African artist mostly known for his steel and mixed media wall sculptures. He was born in Pretoria, South Africa. Murray has a master's degree in fine art from the Michaelis School of Fine Art, 1989. Referred to by critic Brenda Atkinson as "the dark prince of South African pop (art)", Murray is one of the country's most popular artists, often using easily recognisable media images with the addition of a subversive and bitterly funny twist. Murray's work addresses the wars of the cultures, the clash between Afrocentrism and Eurocentrism, the old and the new South Africas. "With my work I hope to critically entertain. Through satirical and tragic reflections on South Africa, I hope to shift people's perspectives and change people's minds, indulgent, arrogant and pretentious as this might sound," he says. More recently, his work has explored his own personal experiences and identity. Murray was also the founder of the sculpture department at Stellenbosch University.

== Defamation suit ==
In 2012, Murray exhibited a painting in a Johannesburg gallery of then-president Jacob Zuma with his genitals exposed, titled The Spear. The painting was part of a show of political work entitled "Hail to the Thief II". On 18 May, the African National Congress announced its intention to sue him for defamation for the painting and to force the gallery to remove it from exhibition, its website, and printed materials. Many public figures expressed outrage at the painting, and one church even called for Murray to be "stoned to death".

On Tuesday 22 May 2012, at 11am two men walked into the Goodman Gallery in Johannesburg with pots of paint and defaced The Spear. They were caught on camera by a news team and were apprehended immediately by gallery security.

During the defamation debate, comparisons were drawn between Murray's The Spear and fellow South African Ayanda Mabulu's work from 2010, Ngcono ihlwempu kunesibhanxo sesityebi. The painting depicts Jacob Zuma in similar fashion alongside Desmond Tutu, Nelson Mandela and other figures from the anti-Apartheid struggle - several sources questioned the potential racial and political motivations in Zuma's attack on Murray, a white artist.

== Collections ==
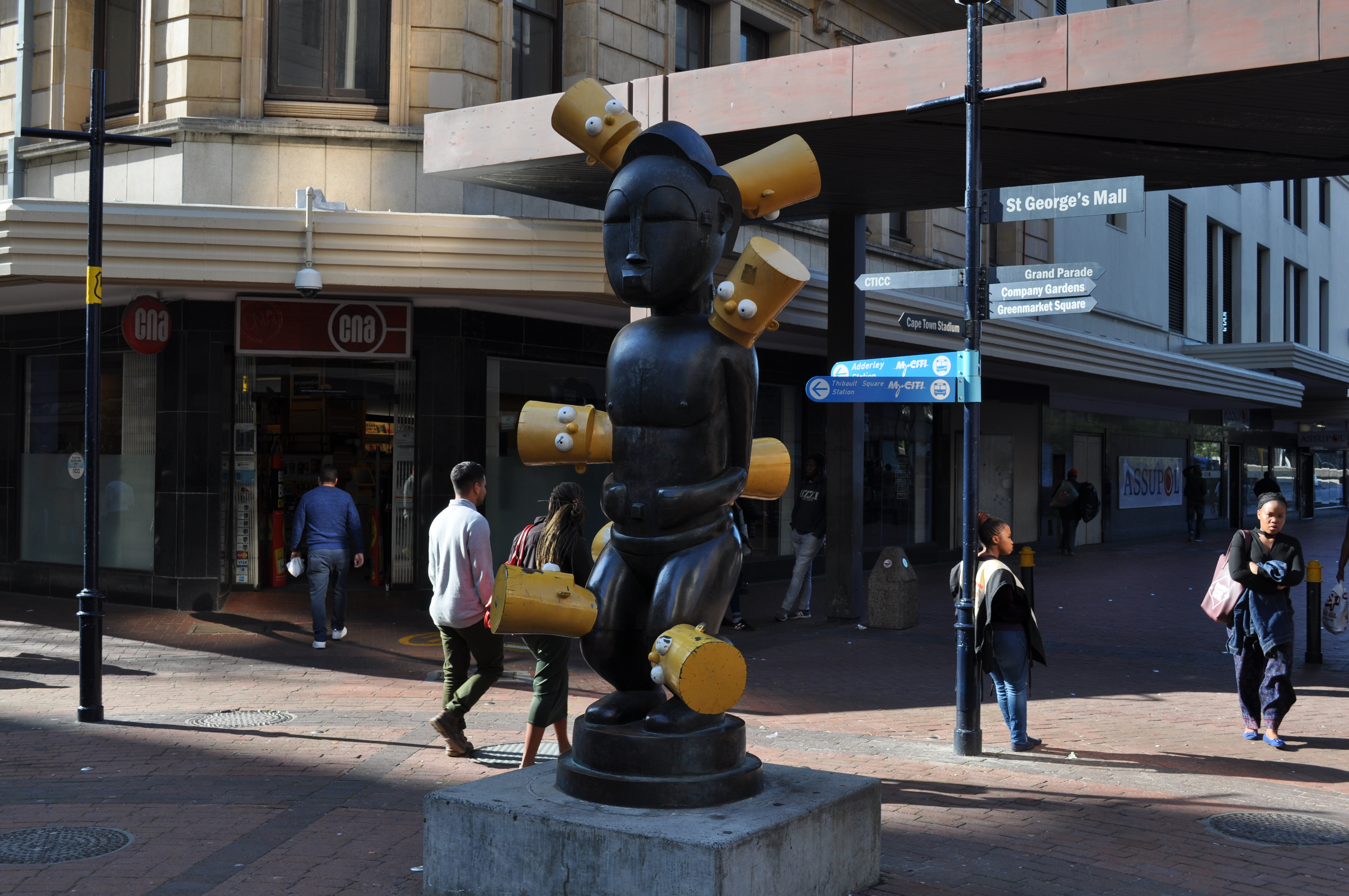
Africa, 2010. Located in Cape Town's pedestrian zone.

- Iziko, South African National Gallery, Cape Town, SA
- Johannesburg Art Gallery, SA
- Durban Art Gallery, SA
- Tatham Art Gallery, Pietermaritzburg, SA
- University of the Witwatersrand, Johannesburg, SA
- University of Cape Town, SA
- University of South Africa, Pretoria, SA
- University of Bloemfontein, SA
- Sandton Municipality, Johannesburg, SA
- DirectAxis Collection, Cape Town, SA
- BHP Billiton Collection, Johannesburg, SA
- MTN Collection, Johannesburg, SA
- Sasol Collection, Johannesburg, SA
- South African Breweries, Johannesburg, SA
- South African Broadcasting Corporation, Johannesburg, SA
- The South African Reserve Bank, Johannesburg, SA
- Vodacom Collection, Cape Town, SA
- Nando’s Art Collection, Johannesburg, SA
- Sindika Dokolo African Collection of Contemporary Art, Luanda, Angola
- Red Bull, Salzburg, Austria
- Collection of Mikki and Stanley Weithorn, USA

== Selected exhibitions ==
- 2010 Spier Contemporary, Stellenbosch, SA
- 2009 Crocodile Tears, Goodman Gallery, Johannesburg, SA
- 2008 Crocodile Tears, Goodman Gallery Cape, Cape Town, SA
- 2006 Sleep Sleep, The Goodman Gallery, Johannesburg, SA and João Ferreira Gallery, Cape Town, SA
- 2003 Us and Them, Axis Gallery, New York, USA
- 2002 Standard Bank Young Artist of the Year Award exhibition, White Like Me, travelling to: National Arts Festival, Grahamstown, SA
- King George VI Art Gallery, Port Elizabeth, SA
- Johannes Stegman Art Gallery, Bloemfontein, SA
- 2001 Hero, Bell-Roberts Contemporary, Cape Town, SA
- 2000 I Love Africa, Bell-Roberts Contemporary, Cape Town, SA and The Goodman Gallery, Johannesburg, SA
- 1997 Own, Hänel Gallery, Cape Town, SA and The Goodman Gallery, Johannesburg, SA
- 1996 Brett Murray: New Sculptures, Gallery Frank Hänel, Frankfurt, Germany
- 1996 White Boy Sings the Blues, Rembrandt van Rijn Gallery, Johannesburg, SA
- 1995 Venice Biennale

== Awards and merits ==
- 2007 Finalist, Spier Contemporaries
- 2002 Winner, collaboration with the late Stefaans Samcuia, Cape Town International Convention Centre, Public Art Competition
- 1998 Winner, Cape Town Urban Art Foundation, Sculpture Competition
- 1992 Finalist, Cape Town Urban Art Foundation, Sculpture Competition
- 1992 Finalist, Waterfront Sculpture Competition, Cape Town
