= Saint Julian the Hospitaller (Piero della Francesca) =

1454–1458 painting by Piero della Francesca

- St Julian
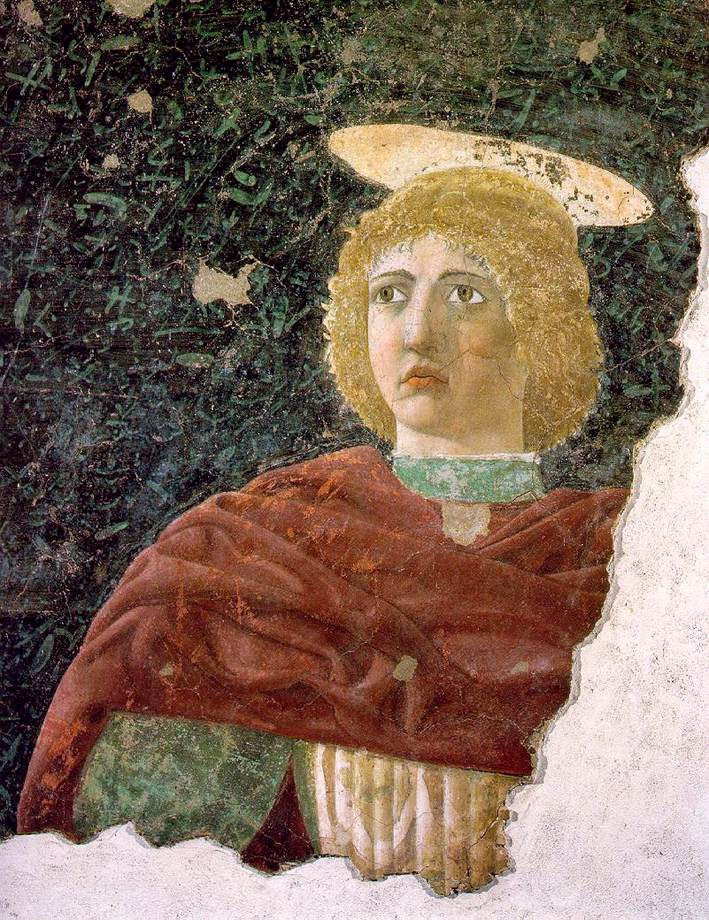
- Year: 1454
- Dimensions: 130 cm (51 in) × 105 cm (41 in)

Saint Julian the Hospitaller is a fresco fragment of 1454–1458 by Piero della Francesca, originally in the former church of Sant'Agostino in Sansepolcro, Tuscany, and now in that city's Museo Civico alongside other works by the artist such as the Resurrection and Saint Louis of Toulouse.

The work dates to the same period as the artist's The History of the True Cross frescoes in Arezzo. It depicts Julian the Hospitaller as an unarmed knight in a red robe over a contemporary green costume. The saint's legs, waist, hands and one shoulder were lost during the work's detachment from its original wall.
