= Museo Civico di Sansepolcro =

Coordinates: 43.5716°N 12.1415°E

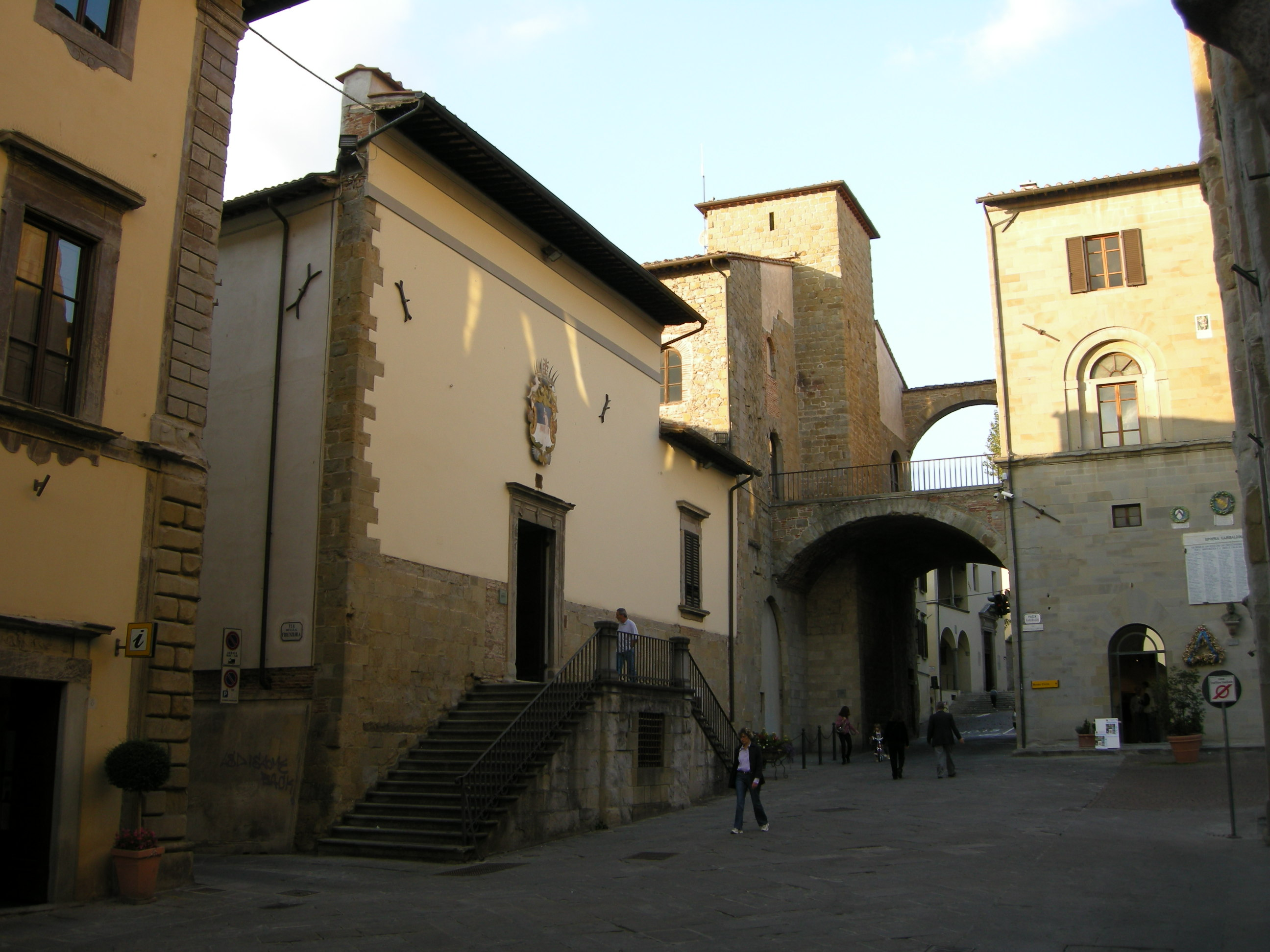
Sansepolcro, museo civico, esterno 02

The Museo Civico di Sansepolcro or Museo Comunale is the town or comune art gallery. It is housed in a series of linked palaces, including the medieval former Palazzo della Residenza, the Palazzo dei Conservatori del Popolo (or Comunale) and the Palazzo del Capitano o Pretorio, located on Via Niccolò Aggiunti #65, near the center of Sansepolcro, formerly Borgo Santo Sepolcro, in the Province of Arezzo, region of Tuscany, Italy. The museum was founded in 1975.

== History ==
The building was occupied by the government offices of the town by the 14th-century. Over the next centuries, it was converted to private housing. It incorporated the former Monte Pio, an early example of a Monte di Pietà

In 1456 it was converted into the Palazzo dei Conservatori, and is decorated with a famed Resurrection fresco by Piero della Francesca. The detached fresco is visible through a glass viewing area. The museum also houses Piero's polyptych of the Maddona della Misericordia altarpiece, with lateral panels of saints, and two fresco fragments depicting Saint Julian the Hospitaller and Saint Louis of Toulouse.

Among the other artists in the collection are: Giuliano Amidei; Leandro Bassano; Antonio and Remigio Cantagallina; Jacopo Carrucci (il Pontormo); Agostino Ciampelli; Raffaellino dal Colle; Domenico Cresti; Giovanni Battista Cungi; Jacopo Empoli; Cristoforo Gherardi; Matteo di Giovanni; Sinibaldo Ibi; Giovanni del Leone; Giovanni Battista Mercati; Gerino da Pistoia; Andrea Pozzo; Andrea Della Robbia; Raffaello Schiaminossi; Santi di Tito; Angelo Tricca; Giovanni de’ Vecchi; and Federico Zoi.
