= Santa Chiara, Sansepolcro =

Religious building in Sansepolcro, Italy

Coordinates: 43.5702°N 12.1391°E

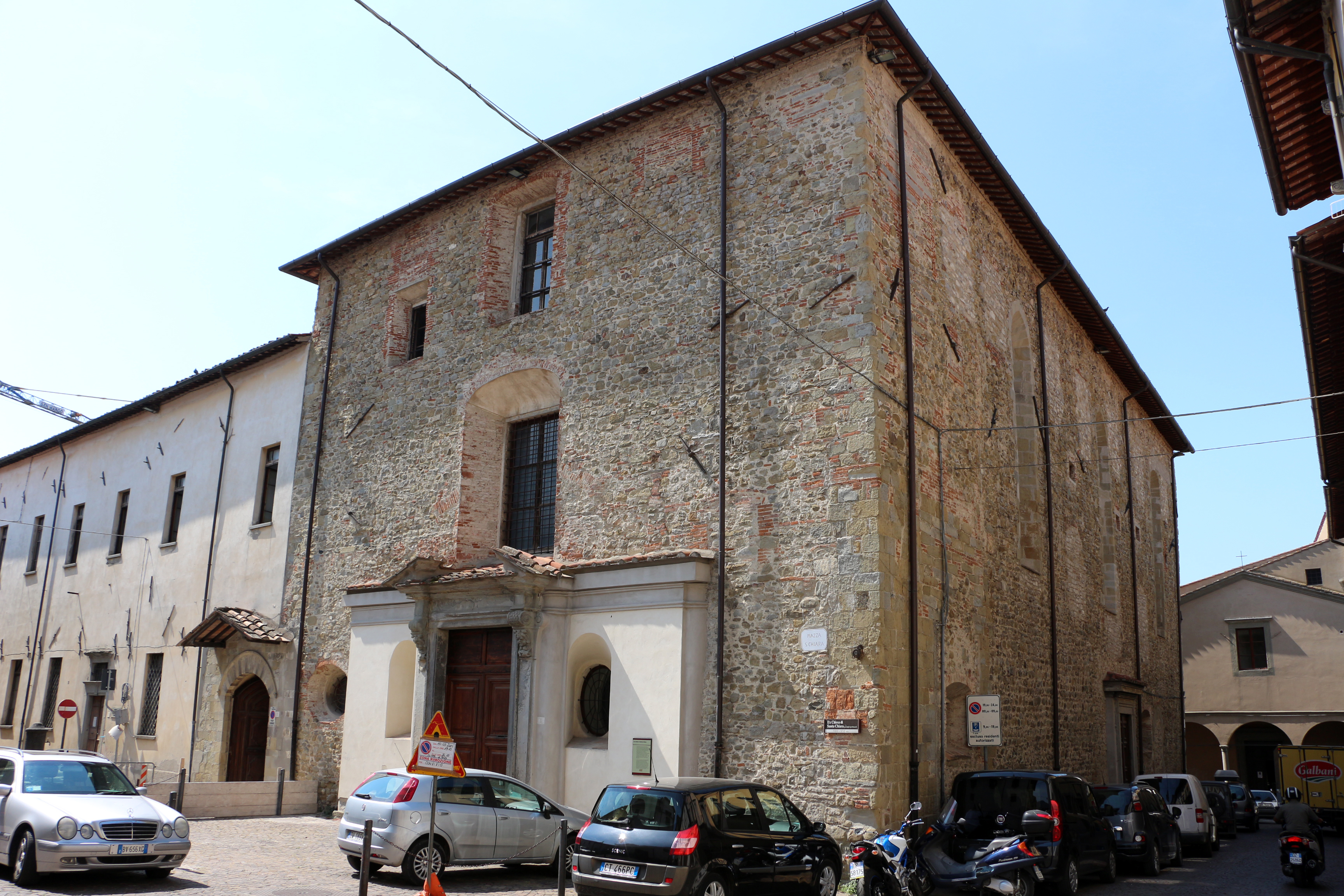
Sansepolcro, erected in 1555

Santa Chiara, formerly Sant'Agostino is a former, Roman Catholic church located in Piazza Santa Chiara in Sansepolcro, province of Arezzo, region of Tuscany, Italy. The church now hosts cultural events. The artwork of the church has been moved to various museums. The church is near to the church of San Lorenzo.

== History ==
An Augustinian convent was present her by the 14th century, but transferred in 1555 to nuns of the Clarissan order, who changed the name to Santa Chiara. The church's exterior and polygonal apse retain the Romanesque layout from 1281. In the 18th-century, the interior was refurbished with baroque stucco decoration.

Among the remaining artwork in the church are a Sant’Andrea fresco by Cherubino Alberti at the third altar, and a 16th-century fresco of the Assumption of the Virgin on the main altar. The fresco depicting San Giuliano (1455) by Piero della Francesca is now in Sansepolcro's Pinacoteca.
