= Giovanni Battista Cungi =

Italian painter

Giovanni Battista Cungi (active, 1538 - 1592) was an Italian painter of the late-Renaissance or Mannerist period, active mainly in Florence and Tuscany.

== Biography ==
He was born in Borgo San Sepolcro and pupil of Giorgio Vasari, for whom in 1538 he made designs from Roman monuments, specifically grotteschi. He then aided Cristoforo Gherardi in the decoration, with mythologic subjects and grotteschi, of the Castello Bufalini in San Giustino in Umbria. An Annunciation by Cungi is present in the Museo Civico di Sansepolcro.
