= Mystic Marriage of Saint Francis =

Painting by Sassetta

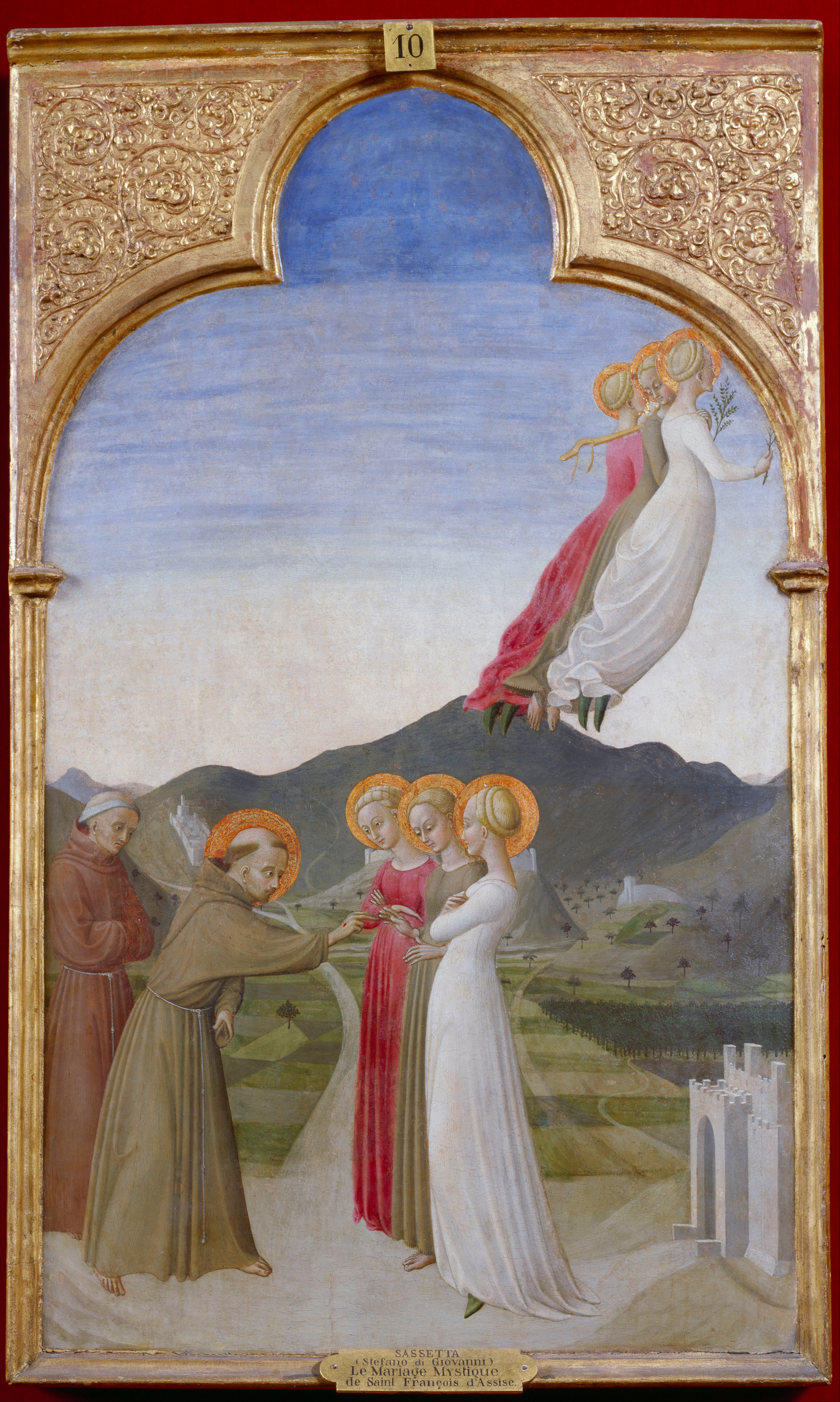
- Artist: Sassetta
- Year: c. 1450
- Medium: Tempera on panel
- Dimensions: 95 cm × 58 cm (37 in × 23 in)
- Location: Musée Condé, Chantilly

The Mystic Marriage of Saint Francis is a painting by the Italian Renaissance artist Sassetta, now in the Musée Condé in Chantilly, France.

== Description ==
The painting by Stefano di Giovanni di Consolo, known as il Sassetta (c. 1392 – 1450 or 1451), was originally part of a polyptych at Sansepolcro, where it was seen by Piero della Francesca.

It portrays Saint Francis of Assisi marrying the three Theological Virtues, Faith, Hope and Charity, through the donation of a ring to them. The three virtues have differently colored dresses: red for Charity, green for Hope and white for Faith. Behind Saint Francis, who wears his traditional brown monk's habit, is his companion Fra' Leone.

Alternatively, the painting illustrates the public pronouncement of Saint Francis's vows according to the evangelical counsels of Poverty, Chastity, and Obedience. Poverty, barefoot and wearing green, is central of the three female figures. A ring is being slipped on her finger as Francis makes his vow of poverty or perfect charity. Next to Poverty, Chastity is in white, and Obedience in red. As the three women leave, Poverty glances back, her bare feet more evident. Obedience, who stood with her arms crossed during the marriage ceremony, bears away a rood cross, both symbols of the cross of Christ and that which Francis will bear as token of his obedience. Chastity bears away the lilies of purity. Poverty carries (what appears to be) a palm frond, emblematic of entry into monastic order, and the victory of spirit over flesh.

St. Francis is shown having, what seems to be, outstretched arms. Which is depicted as him representing the form of a cross. One of the possible inspirations for the painting was the marriage of Mary and Joseph. St. Francis's mystic marriage to these three virtues helps represent the Christian religious concept development through visuals.

The scene is set in an idyllic landscape, between hills, castles and cultivated fields, without any attention to perspective and realism as in other Renaissance works. Sassetta was in fact one of the last painters of the Sienese Gothic school, as shown by the use of elongated figures, the delicate colors and the courtly atmosphere.

The panel is in the collection of the Musée Condé, which is located in Chantilly, France. The Mystic Marriage is one of eight scenes depicting certain aspects within Saint Francis's life. A portion of these panels have since been removed from their original frames and placed in the National Gallery in London. However, some have been slowly added back to their original frames. Specifically, the Mystic Marriage of Saint Francis scene has been set back into its frame. There were the upper register scenes and then the lower register scenes. The Mystic Marriage is said to have had a rectangular frame, meaning that it would have been in the lower register; more specifically, it would have been between the scenes involving Saint Francis's glory, on the left, and his death, on the right. This placement has helped decipher where the remaining five scenes should have been located within the upper and lower registers. Showing Saint Francis's important life stories depicted in very detailed oriented scenes.

== Sources ==
- Zuffi, Stefano (2004). Il Quattrocento (in Italian). Milan: Electa.
- van Os, H.W. 1974. "St. Francis of Assisi as a Second Christ in Early Italian Art". Simiolus: Netherlands Quarterly for the History of Art. 7 (3): 126:
- Banker, James. 1991. "The Program for the Sassetta Altarpiece in the Church of S. Francesco in Borgo S. Sepolcro". I Tatti Studies. 4: 36–37:
- Muir, Carolyn. 2017. "The Mystic Marriage In Christian Art. A Grain of Eternity": 1997 Australian International Religion, Literature and the Arts Conference Proceedings: 96–97: The University of Sydney
