= Death of Cleopatra (Rosso Fiorentino) =

Painting by Rosso Fiorentino

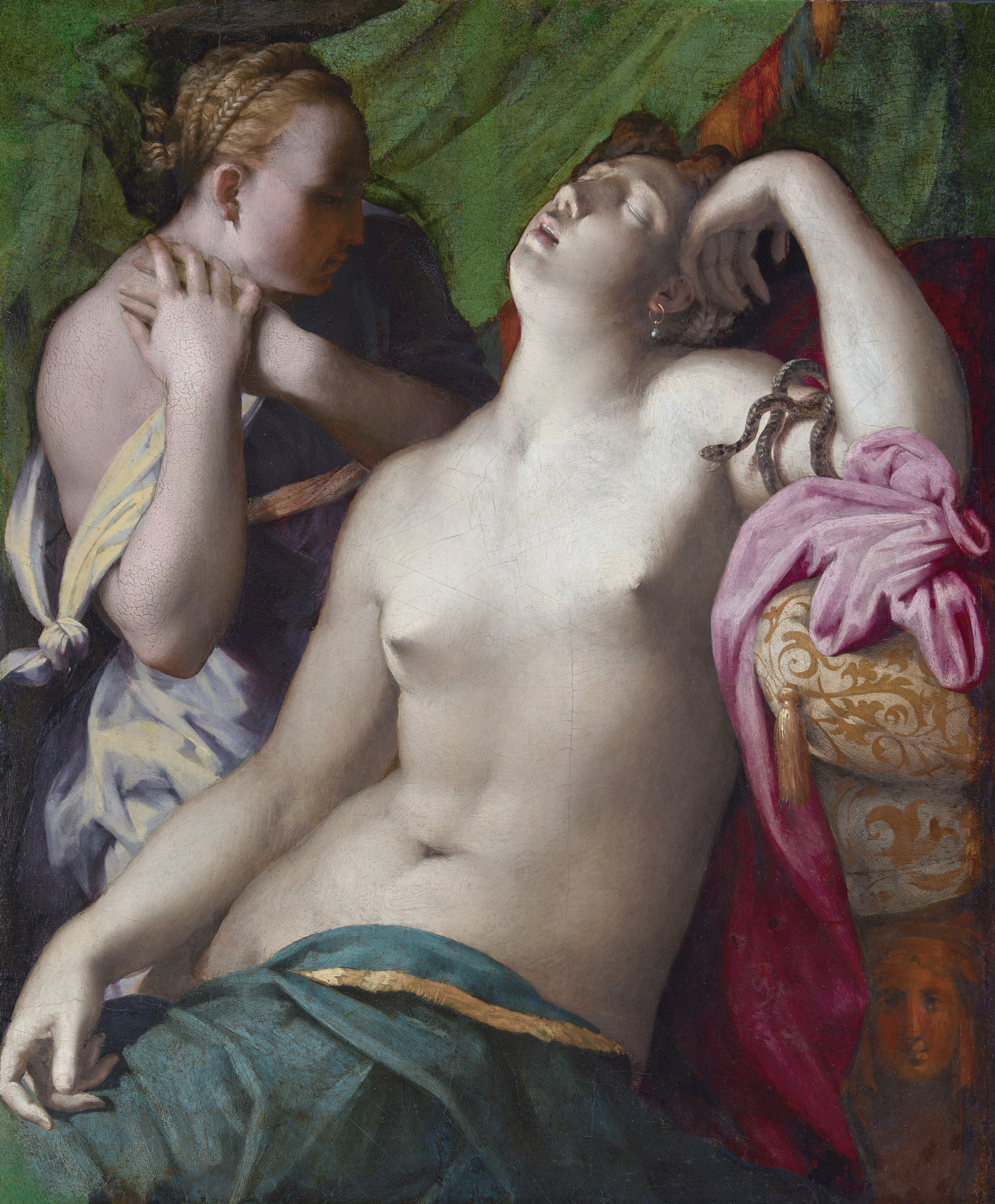
- Artist: Rosso Fiorentino
- Year: c. 1525
- Medium: oil on panel
- Dimensions: 94.7 by 73 centimetres (37.3 in × 28.7 in)
- Location: Herzog Anton Ulrich-Museum, Braunschweig

Death of Cleopatra is a c. 1525 oil on panel painting by Rosso Fiorentino, now in the Herzog Anton Ulrich-Museum, in Braunschweig.

== History ==
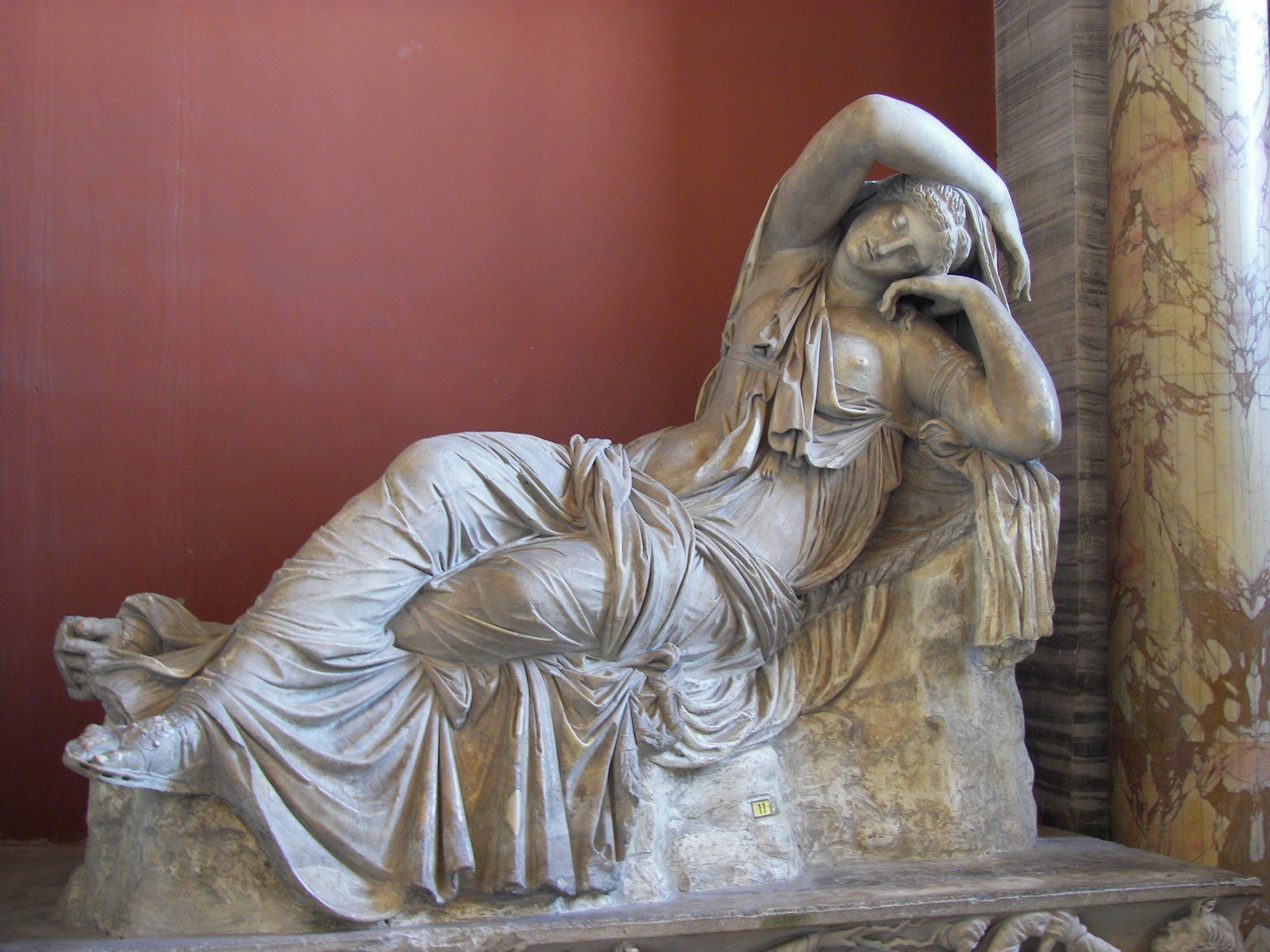
Sleeping Ariadne

It is attributed to the artist's stay in Rome, when he came into contact with classical sculpture. In the preface to the third part of Lives of the Artists, Giorgio Vasari reports that his main influence was the Sleeping Ariadne (Vatican Museums), at that time mistaken for Cleopatra due to its serpent bracelet, then thought to be the asp with which she committed suicide. The sculpture was then in Angelo Maffei's collection before being acquired in 1512 for the Belvedere Courtyard by Pope Julius II.

It is among the most copied works of Rosso as well as the first secular subject he produced before arriving at Fontainebleau Palace. It is typical of his work, with its iridescent textiles, languourous poses, "alla greca" features similar to the Madonna in the Sansepolcro Deposition. Even so, its attribution has previously been a subject of debate and due to its diffuse use of light has previously been placed in the circle of Guido Cagnacci.
