= Santa Maria dei Servi =

Santa Maria dei Servi may refer to the following churches in Italy:

- Santa Maria dei Servi, Bologna
- Santa Maria dei Servi (Siena)
- Santa Maria dei Servi, Padua
- Santa Maria dei Servi, Sansepolcro
