= Sassetta =

15th-century Italian Renaissance painter

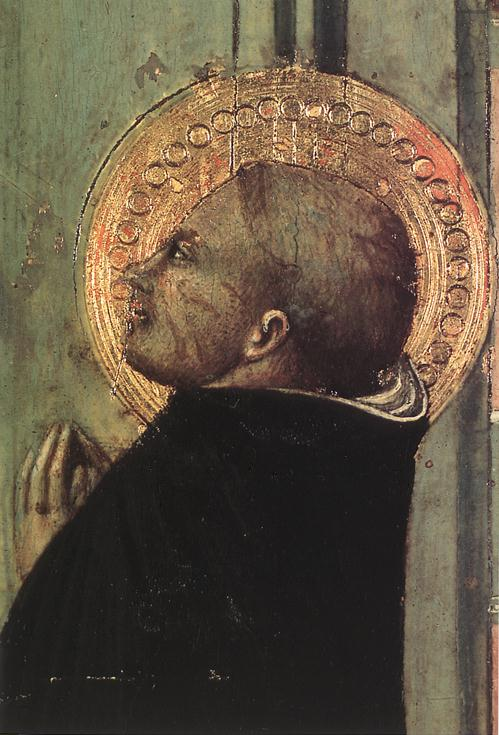
- Detail of Sassetta's St Thomas Aquinas inspired by the Holy Spirit, 1423, Museum of Art, Budapest
- Born: Stefano di Giovanni di Consolo around 1392; Siena or Cortona
- Died: 1450 or 1451 (age 58 or 59); Siena
- Known for: Painting

Stefano di Giovanni di Consolo, known as il Sassetta (c. 1392–1450) was a Tuscan painter of the Late Gothic of the Sienese School style, adapting some Renaissance innovations.

== Life and Works ==
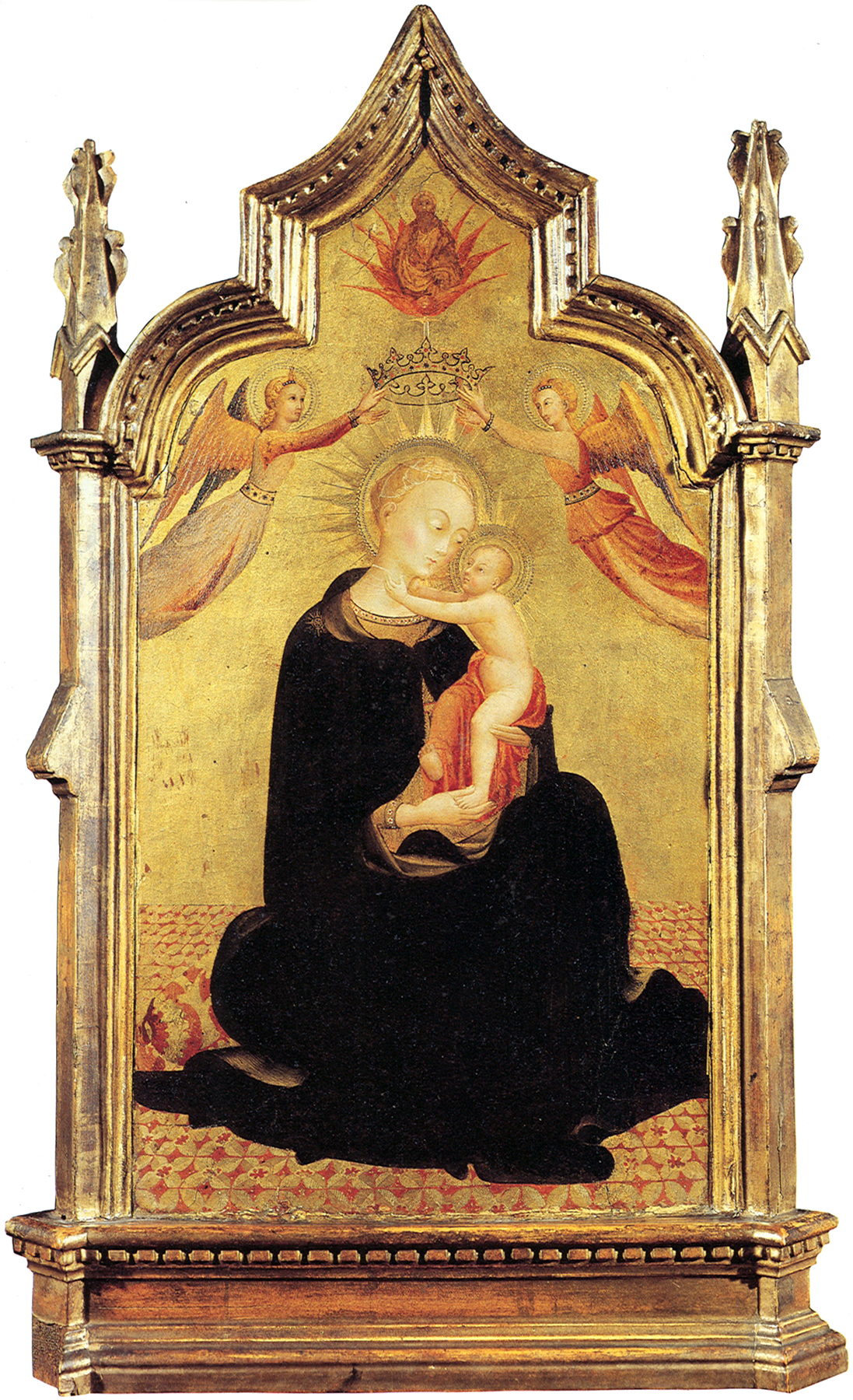

The name Sassetta has been associated with him, mistakenly, only since the 18th century but is now generally used for this artist. The date and birthplace of Sassetta are not known. Some say he was born in Siena although there is also a hypothesis that he was born in Cortona. His father, Giovanni, is called da Cartona which might entail that Cortona was the artist's birthplace. The meaning of his nickname Sassetta is obscure and is not cited in documents of his time but appears in sources from the eighteenth century.

Sassetta was probably trained alongside artists like Benedetto di Bindo and Gregorio di Cecco but he had a style all of his own. He achieved a high level of technical refinement and was aware of artistic innovations of talented painters in Florence such as Gentile da Fabriano, Masolino and Masaccio. His work differs from the late Gothic style of many of his Sienese contemporaries.

His first certain work, which originally had his signature, is the Arte della Lana altarpiece (ca. 1423–1426), fragments of which are now divided among various private and public collections.

The Madonna of the Snow altarpiece for the Siena Cathedral was a prestigious commission for Sassetta, and is considered his second major work. Not only does he excel at infusing his figures with a natural light that convincingly molds their shape, he also has an handle on spatial relationships, creating a cohesive space. From this point on Sassetta's style returns to a rather decorative Gothic manner. The polyptych done by Sassetta in San Domenico in Cortona (around 1437) depicts scenes from the legend of St. Anthony the Abbot. He shows great skill in narration through his painting as well as combining a sophisticated color palette and rhythmic compositions. He died from pneumonia contracted while decorating the Assumption fresco on the Porta Romana of Siena. The work was finished by his pupil Sano di Pietro.

Many consider Sassetta's fusing of traditional and contemporary elements as integral to the move from the Gothic to the Renaissance style of painting in Siena. Francesco di Giorgio e di Lorenzo, better known as Vecchietta, is said to have been his apprentice.

== A Miracle of the Eucharist ==
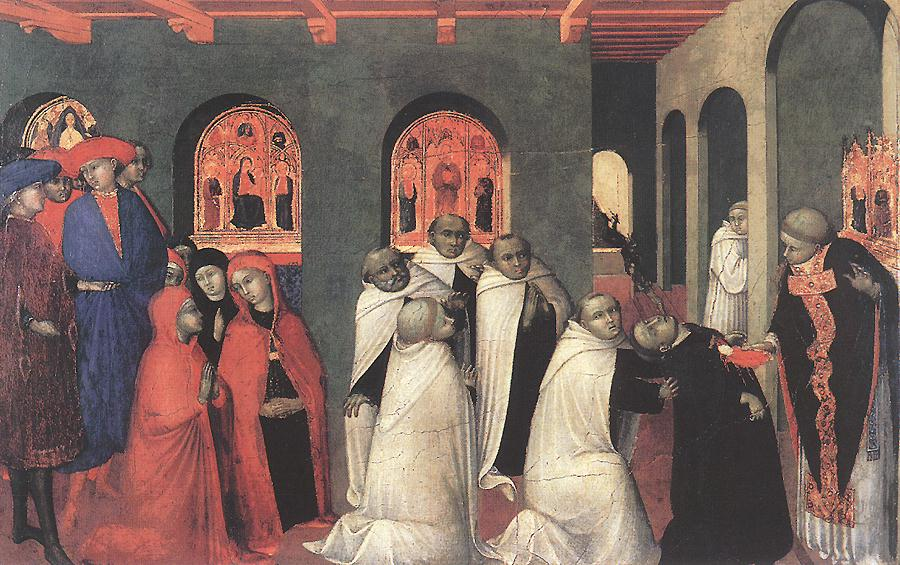
Miracle of the Eucharist

Sassetta was a fiercely pious man. The painting is about the "marriage of righteousness and violence" and the "consequences of sinfulness, the perils of feigning faith and the power of God."

The figure in black in the painting is an unbeliever, who has been found out in the process of receiving Communion. The officiating priest offers him the host on a plate, which is pictured miraculously spurting blood. The unbeliever has been struck dead instantly, and the creature above his face is a tiny black devil which has swooped down to snatch away his soul to the depths of Hell. The other men pictured are Carmelite monks, caught in expressions of shock, amazement and disgust. The painting is a "carefully staged, meticulously created illusion" which commemorates the Miracle of Bolsena which is said to have taken place in 1263. Sassetta's Altarpiece of the Eucharist was later divided between three museums (British, Hungarian and Italian), the Vatican, and a private collection.

== The Borgo San Sepolcro Altarpiece ==
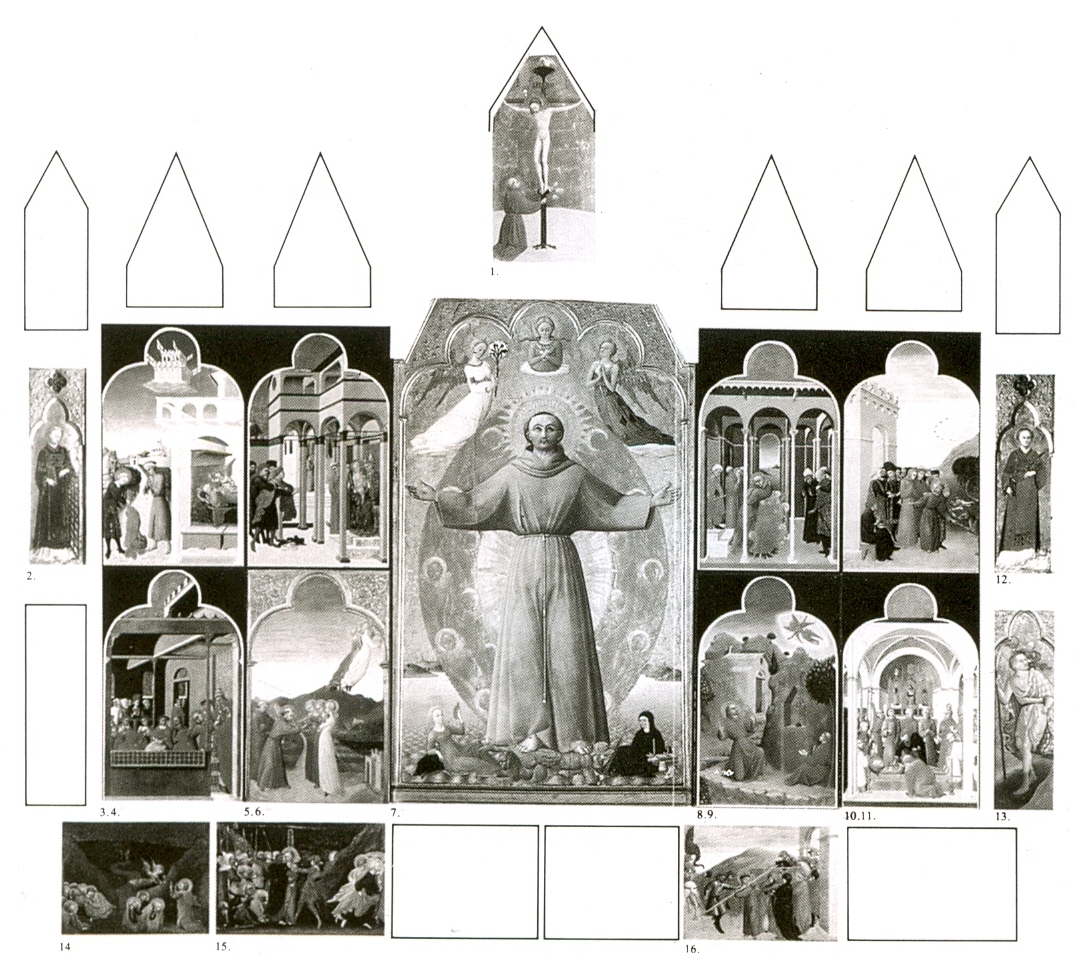
Reconstruction of the Borgo san Sepolcro Altarpiece, reverse side

The altarpiece was originally painted in Siena, and transported to Sansepolcro for to be placed in the church of San Francesco. In October 1900 the Berenson family purchased three panels created by Stefano di Giovanni. The Berensons' collection consisted of St. Francis in Glory, flanked by the standing Blessed Ranieri and St. John the Baptist, which scholars determined are only a part of a complex altar which had now become scattered among twelve collections throughout Europe and North America. It is generally accepted by the art historical community that Sassetta's San Francesco altarpiece was one of the largest and most expensive of the Quattrocento. The fact that it was produced by a Sienese artist in Siena, and shipped to the Tiber Valley town in late spring 1444 also speaks to Sassetta's fame in his time period.

Bernard Berenson bequeathed many of Sassetta's painting from his Florence Villa to Harvard University, in what became the Center for Italian Renaissance Studies in Florence. A 3D computer-assisted reconstruction of the altarpiece's surviving parts is featured in Sassetta: The Borgo San Sepolcro Altarpiece, edited by Machtelt Israels and released in 2009.

== Controversy ==
There is some contention among art historians over which Sienese masters were directly responsible for which paintings. It has been questioned whether the Scenes from the life of St. Anthony of Egypt are rightly attributed to Sassetta, and critics such as Donald Bruce believe that artists of near-equal talent, such as the Griselda master, also deserve attention for their achievements in art at this period.

== Selected works ==
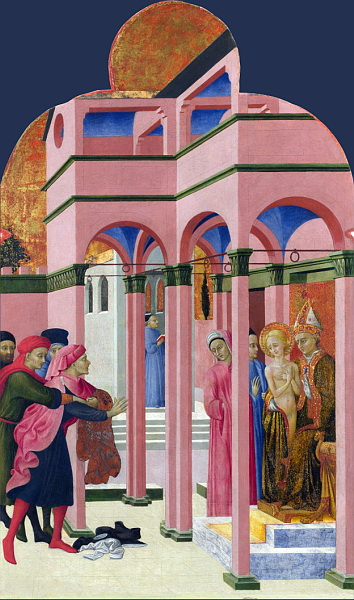
Saint Francis Abandons His Father.

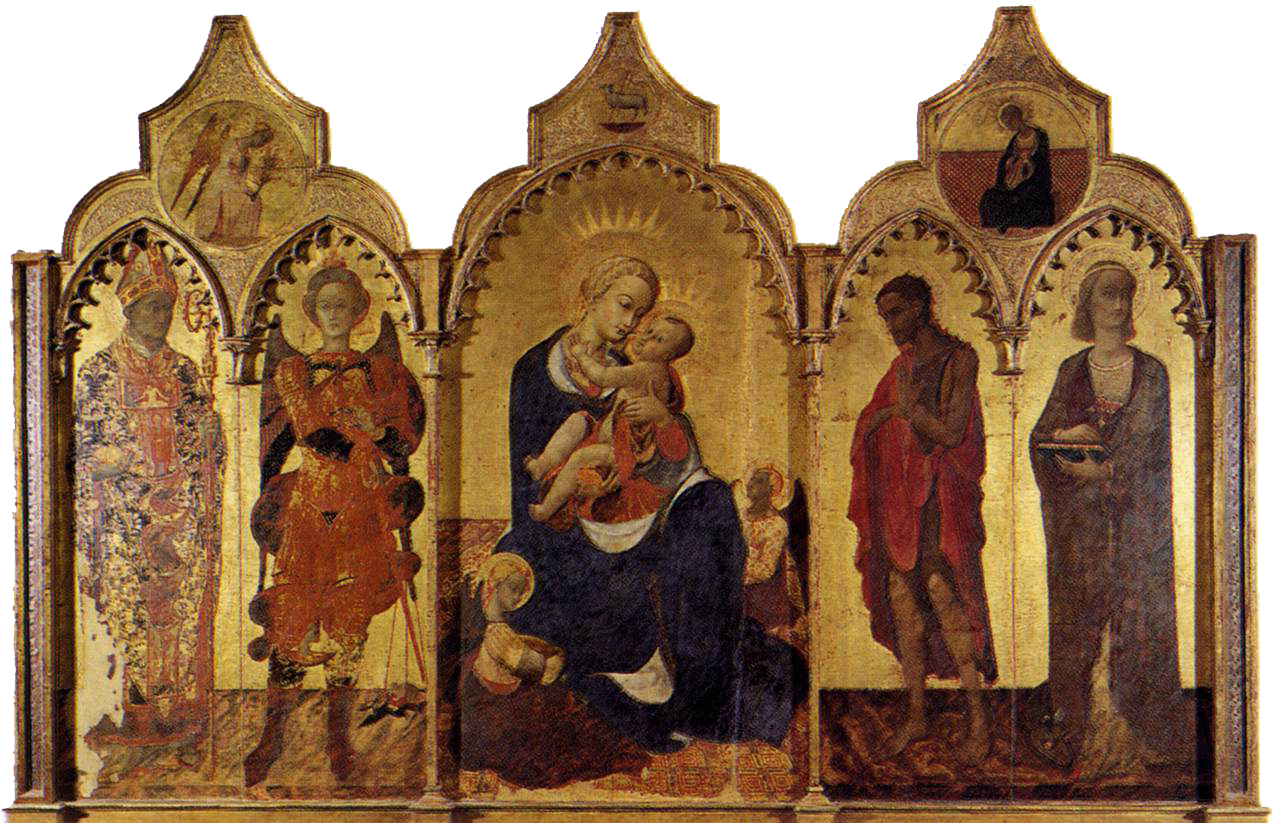
Sassetta, Madonna col Bambino e quattro santi

- Meeting of The Meeting of St. Anthony the Great and St. Paul of Thebes (c. 1440), tempera on wood, National Gallery of Art, Washington D.C., USA
- Saint Thomas Aquinas's Vision before the Cross, (1423), Pinacoteca Vaticana
- Saint Thomas Aquinas inspired by the Holy Spirit, tempera on wood, Museum of Fine Arts, Budapest
- Madonna of the Snows Altarpiece (c. 1430–1432), Galleria degli Uffizi, Florence
- A predella of three works at the Detroit Institute of Arts
- San Domenico da Cortona Polyptych (c. 1434), Diocesan Museum, Cortona, Italy
- The Journey of the Magi (1435) Metropolitan Museum of Art, New York, USA
- Saint Anthony the Hermit Tortured by Devils, Pinacoteca Nazionale, Siena
- Virgin and Child Adored by Six Angels (1437–44), Louvre Museum, Paris, France
- The Burning of a Heretic (1423), National Gallery of Victoria, Melbourne, Australia
- Last Supper (1423), Pinacoteca Nazionale, Siena
- Ecstasy of Saint Francis (1437–44), Villa I Tatti, Settignano, Italy
- The Miracle of the Eucharist, Bowes Museum, Barnard Castle, United Kingdom
- Saint Francis receiving Stigmata (1437–44), National Gallery, London, United Kingdom
- Mystic Marriage of St. Francis (c. 1450), Musée Condé, Chantilly, France

== Sources ==
- Miklós Boskovits, David Alan Brown. Italian Paintings of the Fifteenth Century. National Gallery of Art, Washington/Oxford University Press, New York 2003, pp. 621–625.
- Andrew Graham-Dixon, Paper Museum: Writings about Paintings, mostly (New York : Knopf, 1997), pp. 33–36.
- Machtelt Israels (ed.). Sassetta: The Borgo San Sepolcro Altarpiece. 2 vols. Florence: Villa I Tatti, 2009.
- Fabrizio Nevola. "Reviews". Renaissance Quarterly, Vol. 63, No. 2. Chicago 2010, pp. 589–591.
- Donald Bruce, "Sienese Painting at the London National Gallery". The Contemporary Review, Winter2007, Vol. 289 Issue 1687, p. 481.

=== Further reading ===
- Luciano Bellosi, Alessandro Angelini (eds.). Sassetta e i pittori toscani tra XIII e XV secolo. Studio per Edizioni Scelte, Florence 1986.
- B. Berenson, Sassetta, Florence 1946.
- Enzo Carli. Sassetta's Borgo San Sepolcro Altarpiece. Burlington Magazine 43, 1951, pp. 145 ff.
- Enzo Carli. Sassetta e il "Maestro dell'Osservanza". Milan 1957.
- Enzo Carli. I Pittori senesi. Milan 1971.
- John Pope-Hennessy. Sassetta. London 1939.
- John Pope-Hennessy. Rethinking Sassetta. Burlington Magazine 98, 1956, p. 364.
- Federico Zeri. "Towards a Reconstruction of Sassetta's Arte della Lana Triptych". Burlington Magazine 98, 1956, pp. 36 ff.
