= Pietà (Rosso Fiorentino) =

Painting by Rosso Fiorentino

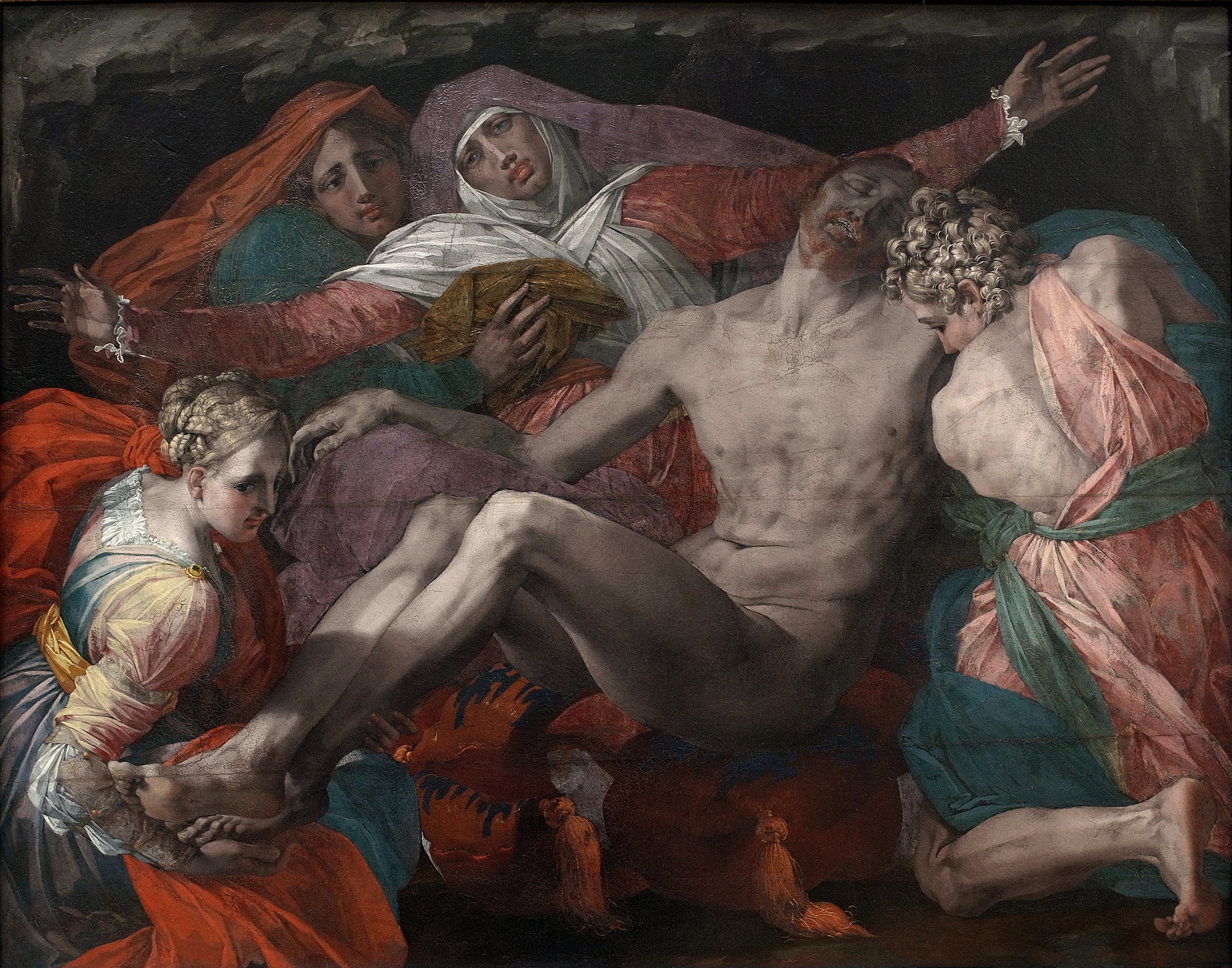
- Artist: Rosso Fiorentino
- Year: c. 1537-1540
- Medium: oil on panel, transferred to canvas
- Dimensions: 127 by 163 centimetres (50 in × 64 in)
- Location: Louvre, Paris

Pietà is a c.1537-1540 oil painting by Rosso Fiorentino, originally painted on panel and later transferred to canvas. Now in the Louvre in Paris, it is the only securely-identified original painting by the artist known to have been produced for a courtier of Francis I of France. X-ray examination has shown an initial composition under the bodies of Christ and St John.

According to Vasari's Lives of the Artists, it was commissioned by Constable of France Anne de Montmorency soon after the artist's work on the Francis I Gallery at Fontainebleau Palace. De Montmorency's coat of arms features on the pillow under Christ and it was originally at the doorway to the chapel in his Château d'Écouen, from which it was moved to the Louvre at the end of the 18th century.

== Description and style ==
The body of Christ is represented in the foreground and, semi-extended, occupies the entire surface of the painting. He is echoed by Mary who, desperate, spreads her arms reaching to touch the edges of the painting and symbolically reliving the martyrdom of the crucifixion. It is held by a pious woman with her head covered by a heavy veil of bright red color, while Jesus is held at the feet by the Magdalene, with very refined clothing and hairstyle, and by John the Apostle, represented kneeling from behind on the right in a complex twist, complementary to that of the Magdalene. The figures occupy practically the entire available field, leaving little space for the dark background that simulates the open sepulcher. They have a heroic and dramatic tone, highlighted by the gestures, but austerely restrained, which Antonio Natali defined as "a chorus of Greek tragedy".

The light lingers grazing on the foreground of the composition, leaving the background in darkness, and lighting up various shades of red in the clothing of the characters, contrasted by the white band that wraps around Mary's neck and head, as well as the yellow of the dress of the Magdalene and the whiteness of her lace. The folds of the clothes appear hard, almost sculpted, more sharp than ever.

More than the sophisticated style of Fontainebleau's works, the Pietà recalls the torments of works such as the Sansepolcro Deposition (1528), especially in the pose of the figures. This has led to the hypothesis of a previous dating than the traditional one, at the beginning of the French stay. The hypothesis, however, contrasts with the documents that recall the construction of the Constable's chapel, completed in the 1540s.

== Bibliography ==
- Antonio Natali, Rosso Fiorentino, Silvana Editore, Milano 2006. ISBN 88-366-0631-8
- Elisabetta Marchetti Letta, Pontormo, Rosso Fiorentino, Scala, Firenze 1994. ISBN 88-8117-028-0
