= San Francesco, Sansepolcro =

Roman Catholic church in Tuscany, Italy

Coordinates: 43°34′17.28″N 12°08′32.14″E

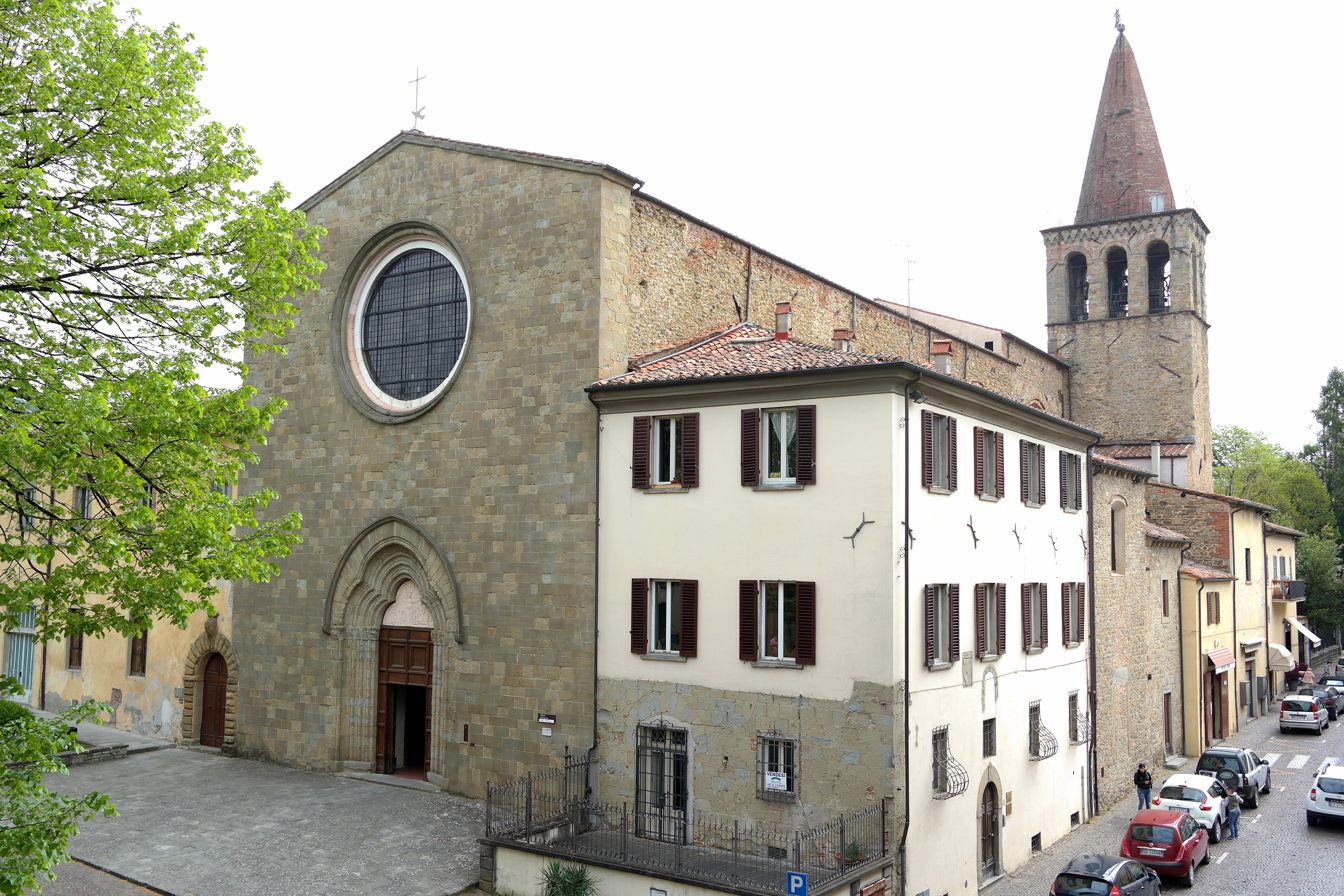
Church of San Francesco in Sansepolcro seen from the terrace of the civic museum

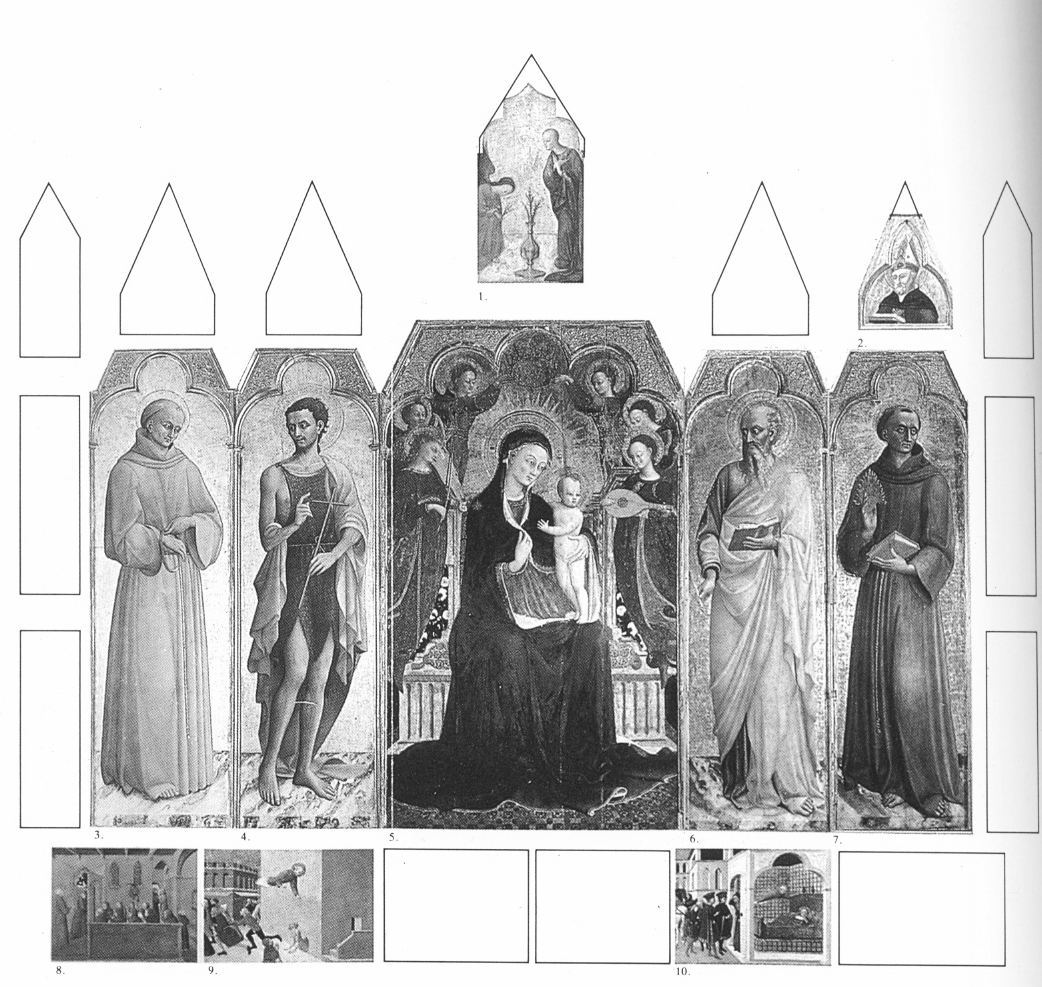
S. Francis Altarpiece.1437-44. Front side. Reconstruction

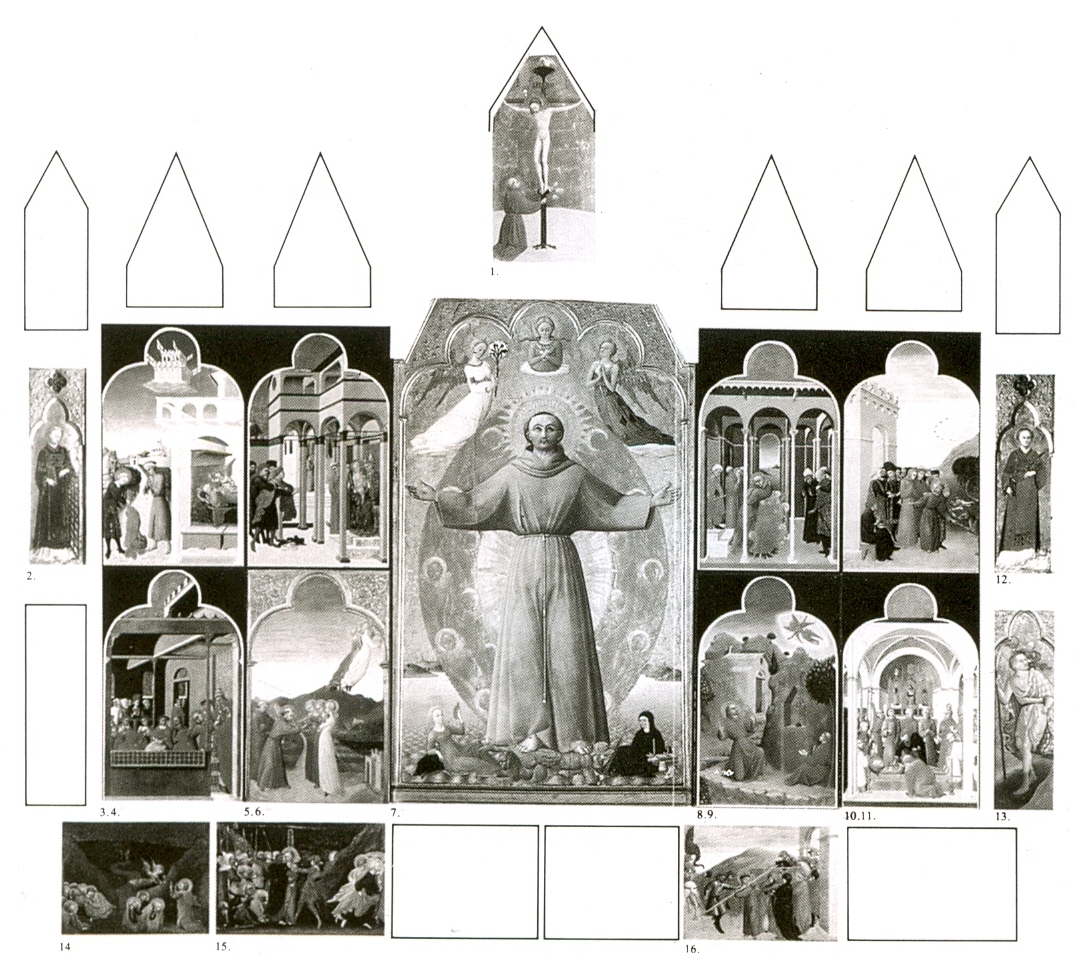
S. Francis Altarpiece.1437-44. Back side. Reconstruction

San Francesco is a Gothic-style, Roman Catholic church and Monastery located in the Piazza of the same name in Sansepolcro, province of Arezzo, region of Tuscany, Italy.

== History ==
These structures, including the bell-tower, were begun in 1258 under the patronage of the Franciscan friar Tommaso da Spello, and underwent reconstruction in the 18th century with stucco decorations. It still contains an altar from 1304. The Convent was occupied by Minori Conventuali. In an 1843 inventory, the main altarpiece depicted a Stigmata of St Frances of Assisi by Giovanni de' Vecchi. The church also had a Dispute in the Temple by Domenico Passignano, and a St Antony of Padua by Giovanni Battista Mercati.

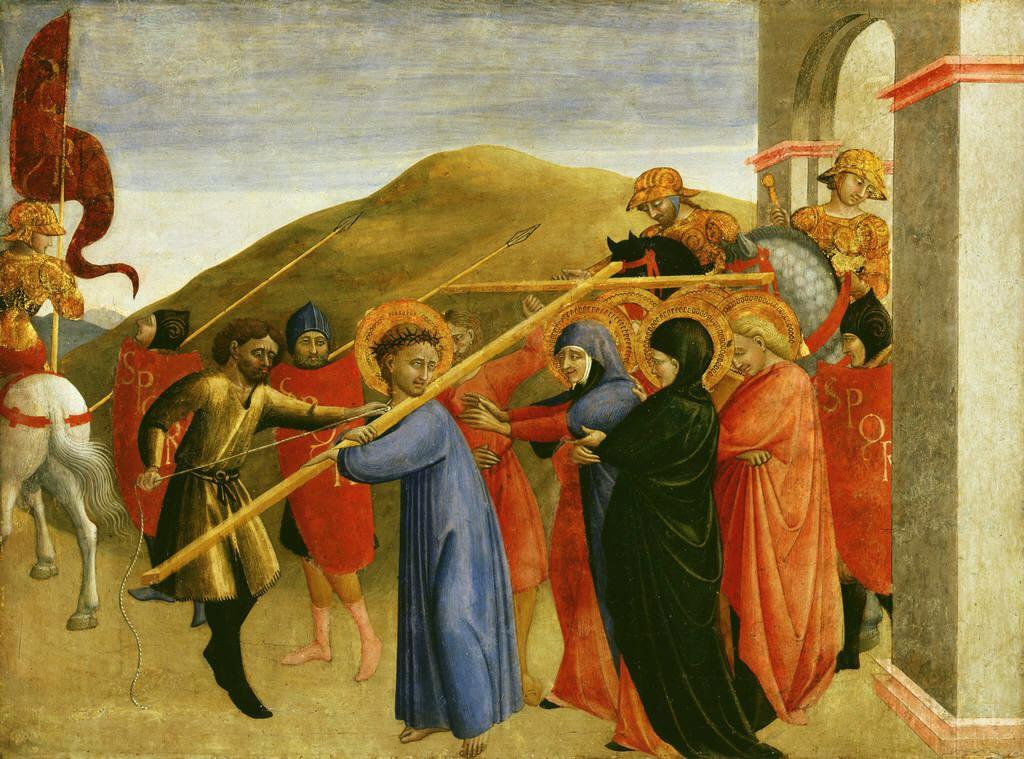
Part of Borgo San Sepolcro altarpiece, now in Detroit Institute of Art

This church was also for centuries the host of the large Gothic-style Borgo San Sepolcro Altarpiece (1437–1444) by the Sienese painter Sassetta. The altarpiece consisted of 60 images and would have stacked up to be some 6 by 5 meters in size. Painted in Siena, costing an exorbitant 510 florins (cost of five houses), it was delivered by cart to Sansepolcro, and assembled in place over the tomb of the Blessed Ranieri Rasini in the church. It was dismembered in 1752. With the Napoleonic suppression of monasteries, the panels were sold. About half of the component panels have been identified among many museums and collections.
