= Buvette de la Renaissance =

Half-timbered house in Blois, France

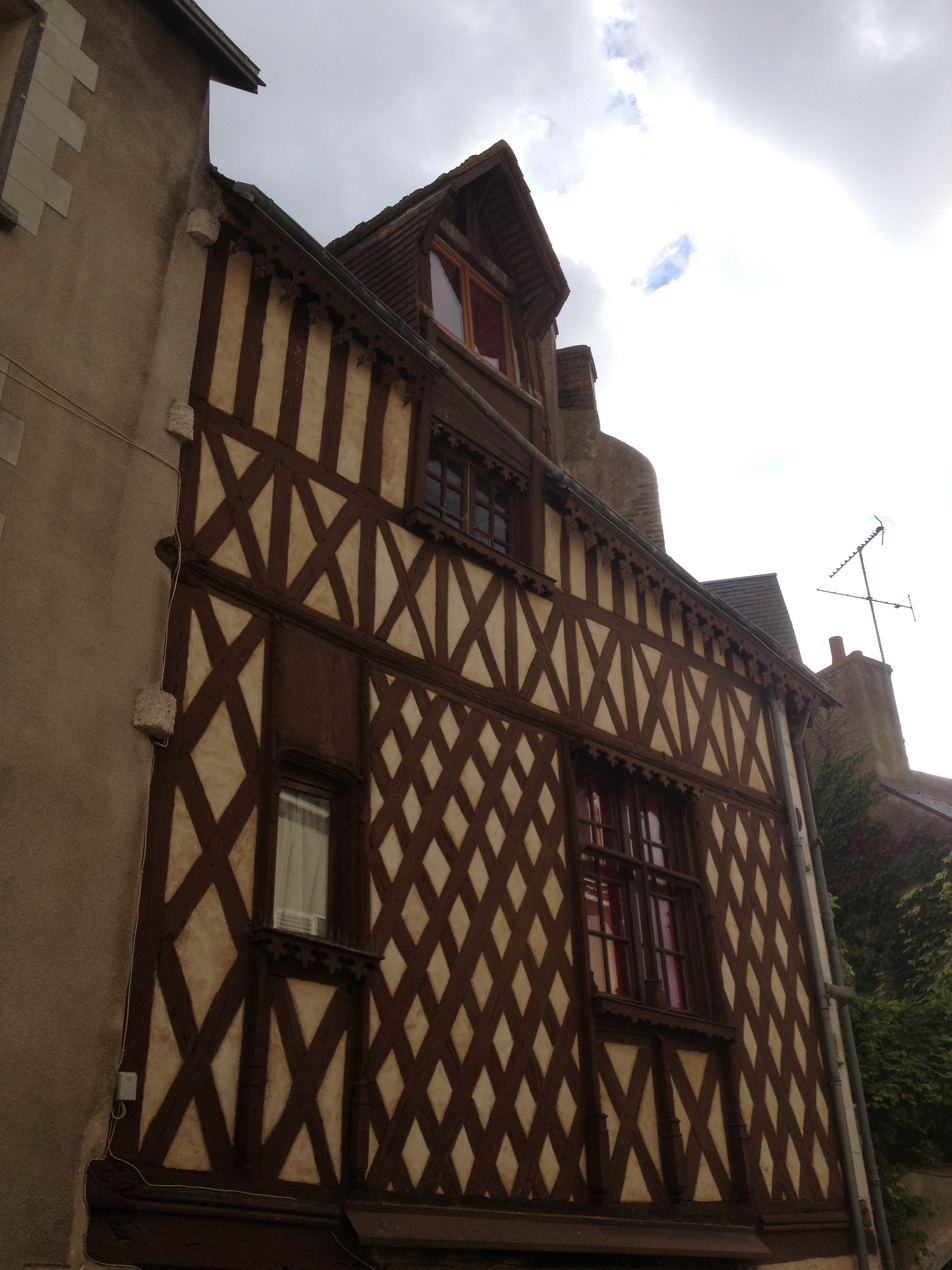
- The house known as the Buvette de la Renaissance, at 21 rue Beauvoir in Blois.
- Interactive map of Buvette de la Renaissance
- 47.588056°N 1.332222°E
- Location: 21 rue Beauvoir, Blois, Loir-et-Cher, France

History
- Built: Late 15th century

Site notes
- Architectural styles: Late Gothic and early French Renaissance

Monument historique
- Official name: Maison dite Buvette de la Renaissance
- Designated: 23 November 1946
- Reference no.: PA00098361

The Buvette de la Renaissance is a half-timbered house located at 21 rue Beauvoir, in the old Bourg-Neuf quarter of Blois, in the Loir-et-Cher department of central France. It went up in the last quarter of the 15th century and still carries most of its original façade decoration: dense diamond framing, carved animal-head drip-stops (so-called engoulants), a few crocketed pinnacles, and several of the earliest Renaissance motifs to turn up on a Blois townhouse. The bay on the left side, framed by St Andrew's Crosses that climb into the gable, is the feature most often singled out by writers on the building. The façade and the roof have been classified as a French monument historique since 23 November 1946.

== Location ==
Rue Beauvoir is a narrow medieval street in the Bourg-Neuf, on the left bank of the Loire, between the ruelle Saint-Lubin and the rue de la Chaîne. Compared with most of the surrounding streets it has done remarkably well: a fair number of its 15th- and 16th-century houses are still standing, despite the road realignments of the 18th and 19th centuries and the bombing of June 1940. No. 21 occupies a long, narrow plot of the kind common in the quarter, sharing party walls on both sides and stretching back well behind the street front.

== History ==
=== Origin and construction ===
The house was put up in the late 1400s, at a moment when Blois was growing quickly thanks to the presence of the royal court. The dossier in the regional Inventaire général dates the whole structure to that period and points out that, despite the date, the carved ornament is still essentially Gothic in feel: engoulants, prismatic mouldings, foliated crockets and the like. Such a rich façade for what is, after all, a town dwelling probably says as much about the wealth of its first owner as it does about the proximity of the royal works at the château.

=== Transformations and restorations ===
The ground floor and the roof were both reworked in the 19th century. The lower storey was largely rebuilt and the slate covering renewed, but the framing pattern of the upper façade was left alone. Repairs in the 20th century stabilised the oak frame and held the carved details in place. By a ministerial decree of 23 November 1946 the façade and roof were classified as a monument historique.

== Architecture ==
=== Frame and bracing ===
The façade is laid out as a grid of lozenges. On the left side the pattern shifts: there the bracing takes the form of St Andrew's Crosses, which run on up into the gable. Both the Inventaire général file and the Alix and Noblet study point out that, on this house, the X-bracings are missing the small horizontal struts they normally carry, so they end up reading more as oversized lozenges than as crosses proper.

=== Openings ===
A mullioned and transomed window has survived, at least in part, on the first floor, with its transom still in place. Another bay on the same level is flanked by slender carved wooden colonettes topped with finials.

=== Carved decoration ===
Moulded bands set with animal heads run across the front at each floor level. The wall plates have engoulé drip-stops, that is, the carved head appears to "swallow" the end of the moulding; this is a fairly typical Blois feature. Pinnacles with foliated crockets break up the line of the posts and door jambs, and the colonettes are carved with scales and twists, a decorative repertoire that was in use in the town between roughly 1500 and 1530.

=== Plan and materials ===
There is a barrel-vaulted cellar below ground. Above it, the building is one upper storey plus an attic. A wooden newel staircase, set inside the main body of the building, takes care of vertical circulation. The structure mixes an oak frame with rubble and ashlar limestone, all assembled with mortise-and-tenon joints in the way usual for Blois houses of the period. Some brick infill on the façade was recorded before the late-20th-century restoration, which is not unusual for the town's 16th-century buildings. The roof is steeply pitched on two long sides, with a covered gable, and the covering is slate.

== Stylistic significance ==
The building gathers together a number of features that are very much specific to Blois: prominent diamond framing, early Renaissance carving (colonettes with finials, twisted and scaled pinnacle shafts, engoulants) and details that recall the Louis XII wing of the nearby Château de Blois. In combination they make it a useful example of the way in which Gothic and Renaissance traditions overlapped in the town's domestic architecture, rather than replacing one another in any neat sequence.

== State of conservation ==
The 1986 Inventaire général survey described the house as in poor condition at the time it was visited. That description is now nearly forty years old and may not match the current state of the building.

== Local context ==
Rue Beauvoir has held on to more 15th- and 16th-century timber-framed houses than most streets in Blois. Several of them share elements with no. 21. The house at no. 5 has lozenges in the centre and St Andrew's Crosses on the side bays, producing what is more or less a mirror image of the composition at no. 21. Nos. 13 and 15 form a pair of similar serial timber-framed dwellings. No. 18 carries pilasters with Corinthian-style capitals on its first floor, one of them with a cartouche, which gives the front a noticeably more Italian look. On the nearby rue de la Chaîne, no. 32 is worth a look for comparison: lozenges combined with an egg-and-dart cornice and dentils. Engoulé wall plates appear on a number of other houses in the area as well, including nos. 26 and 30 rue de la Chaîne, no. 30 rue de la Foulerie and no. 8 rue Pardessus.

== Iconography and documentation ==
Two photographs of the building are kept at the Médiathèque du patrimoine et de la photographie at Charenton-le-Pont. The earlier one, a partial view of the street front, was taken in 1945 and is catalogued under AP12R080615. A second one, taken by Klaus Freckmann in 2018, is catalogued as AP16R001170. The Inventaire général file for the Centre-Val de Loire region includes a view of the street façade by Jean-Claude Jacques (1986).

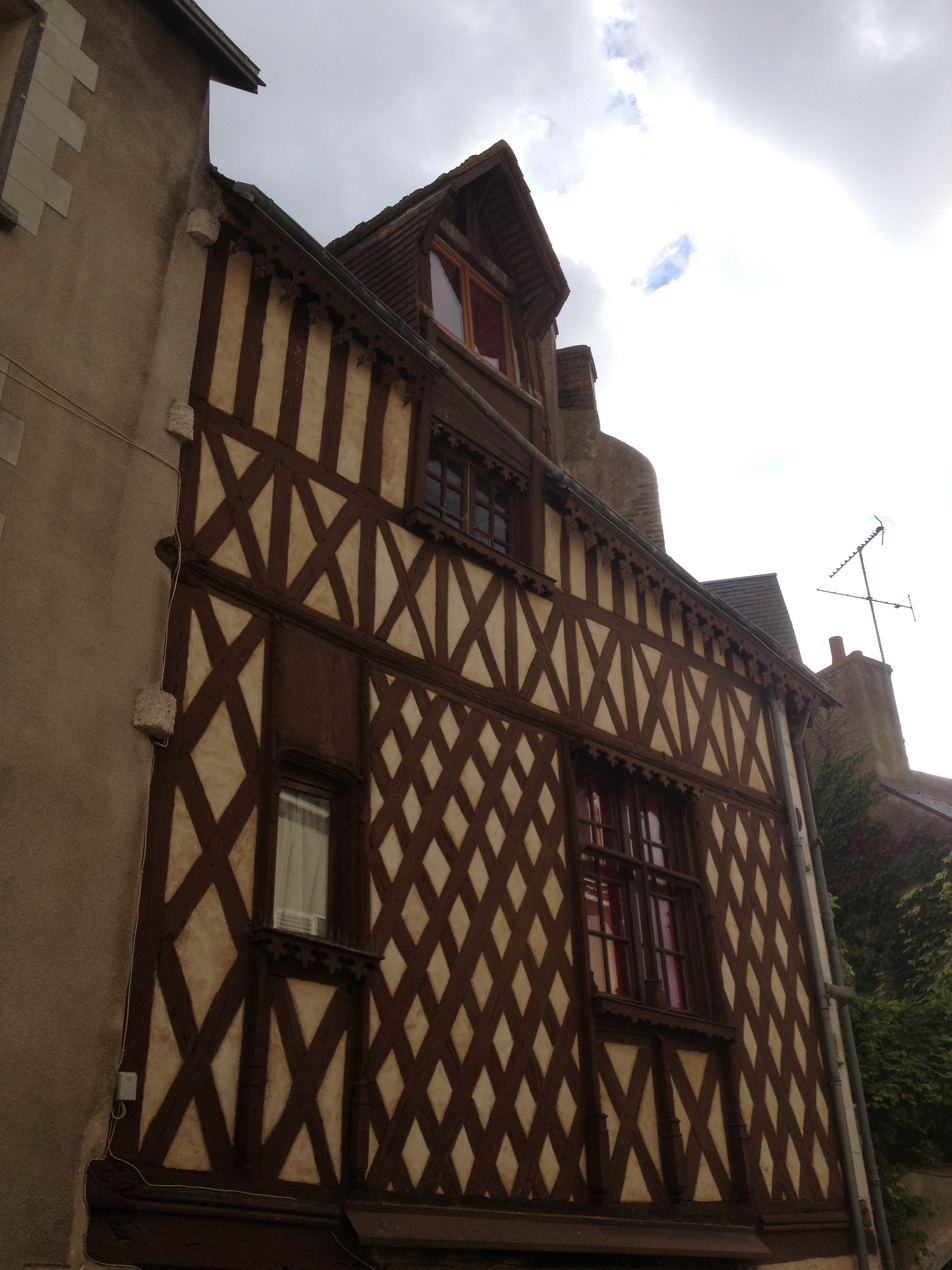
Main façade.

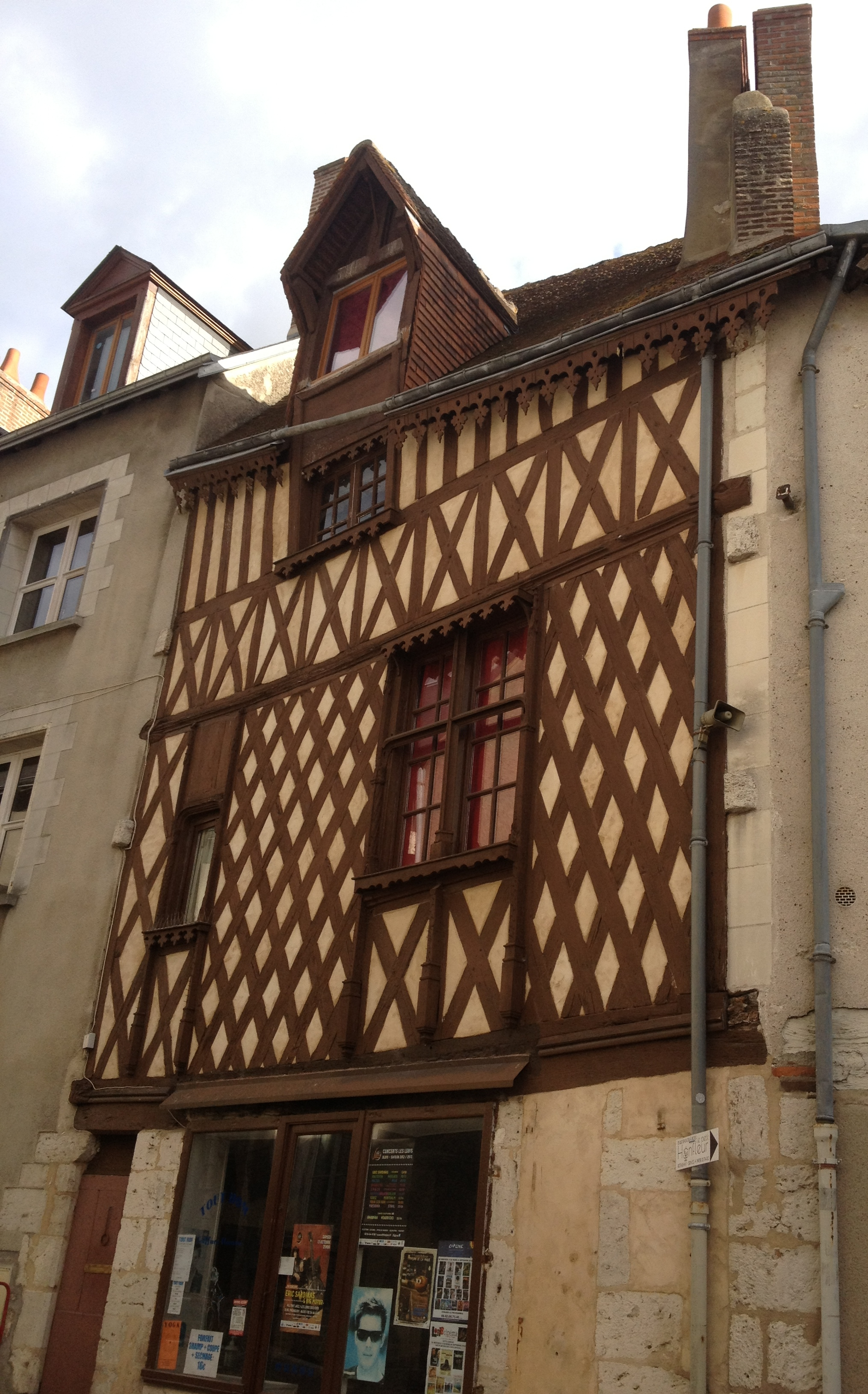
Close-up view of the lozenge framing.

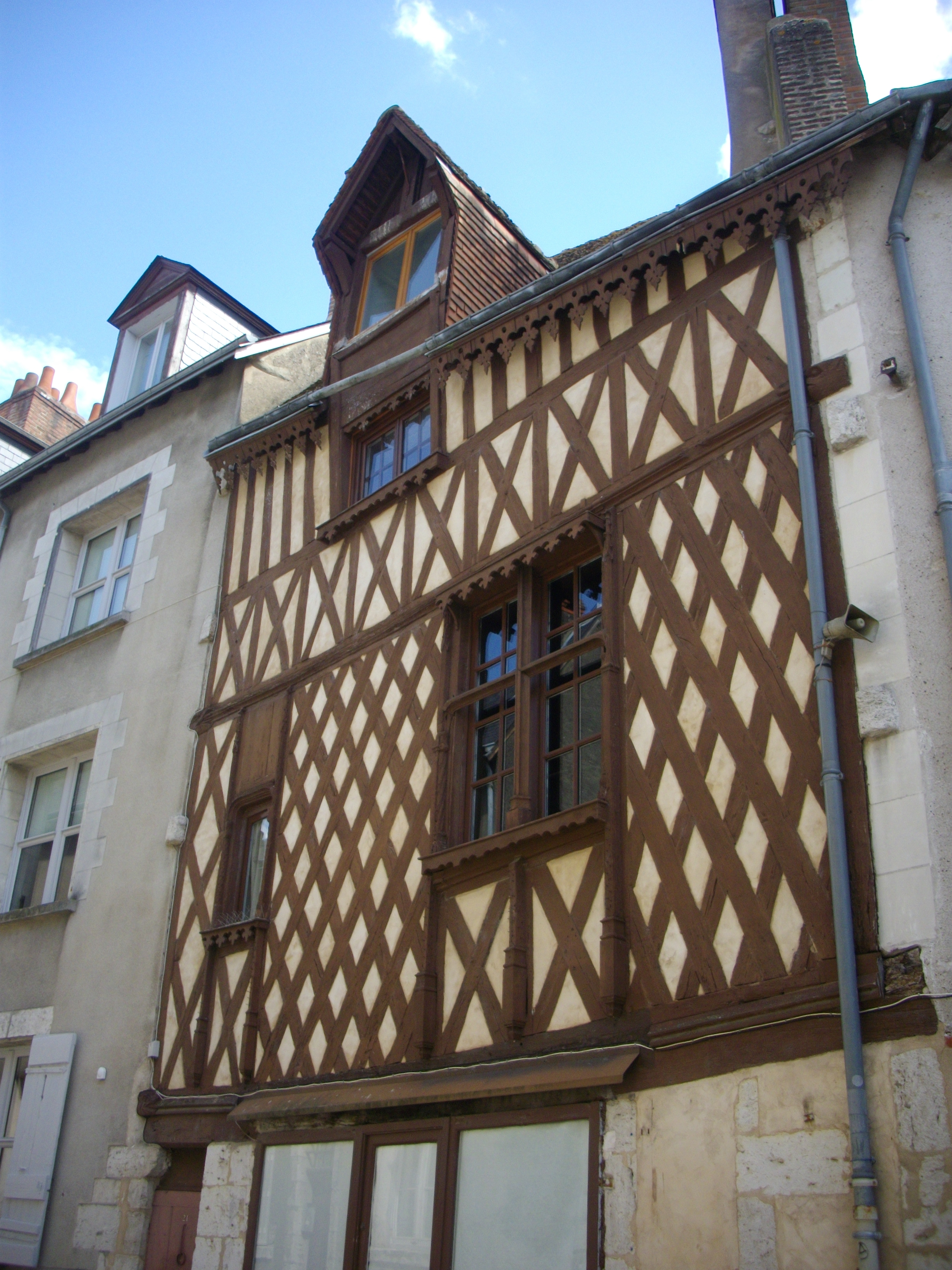
Detail of the carved decoration.

== Heritage protection ==
The façade and roof were classified as a monument historique by ministerial decree of 23 November 1946, covering cadastral plot DN 829. The house is generally considered one of the best-preserved examples of late-15th-century timber framing in Blois, and its lozenge framing and carved decoration are usually cited as a textbook illustration of the transition from late Gothic to early Renaissance in the town's domestic architecture.
