= Teatro Dante (Sansepolcro) =

Coordinates: 43°34′10.34″N 12°8′38.83″E

- cinema teatro Dante
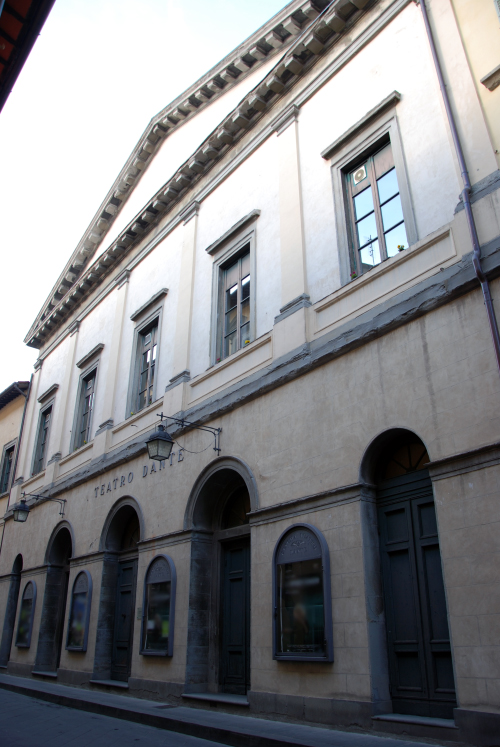
- Exterior of theatre Dante
- Interactive map of Teatro Dante
- Address: 156, XX Settembre avenue Sansepolcro, Tuscany; Italy
- Owner: Accademia dei Risorti
- Capacity: 400
- Type: Cinema, Theater
- Screen: 1

Construction
- Opened: September 1, 1836
- Architect: Francesco Leoni

Website
- www.cinemateatrodante.net

Teatro Dante (also called Cinema Teatro Dante) is an Italian theatre in Sansepolcro, a town in Tuscany, Italy, in the province of Arezzo.

The theatre was inaugurated on 1 September, 1836, and was originally known as the Royal Theatre Dante (Regio Teatro Dante). Its inaugural performance was Vincenzo Bellini's opera La sonnambula (The Sleepwalker). The building has historically been associated with the Accademia dei Risorti ("Academy of the Resurrected" ), which owns the theatre.

In addition to operating as a movie theater, Teatro Dante hosts theatrical productions, concerts, operettas, and other live performances.

== History ==
=== Founding and Teatro della Fortuna ===
According to accounts of the theatre's history, the project was commissioned in September 1674 during the reign of Cosimo III de' Medici, Grand Duke of Tuscany, as part of an effort to promote cultural activities in the towns of the Grand Duchy of Tuscany.

The institution was initially known as '''Teatro della Fortuna''' ("Theatre of Fortune") and was managed by the local ''Accademia degli Sbalzati'', led by the poet Pietro Gherardi.

The ''Accademia degli Sbalzati'' ceased to exist in 1727. It was succeeded by another local association, known as the '''Accademia dei Nobili''', which continued to support theatrical activities and the use of the building.

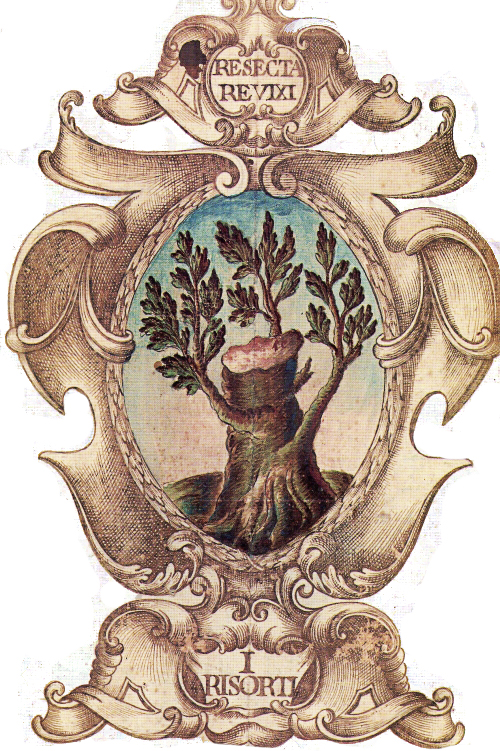
Blazon of Accademia dei Risorti

=== The nineteenth century and the Dante theatre ===
The theatre operated regularly until 1832, when two local academies, The Nobles and The Resurrected, formed the Academy of the Nobles Resurrected. To witness this union, an olive tree became the new blazon of the association, cut at the lower end with new branches growing back on the sides, symbolizing the definitive rebirth of the association. The academy was not to be the only one to be renewed. The old theater, now dilapidated and in poor condition, was demolished in favor of a new building, built in stone in front of the old theater. Work began in 1833, a year after the birth of the new academy, led by the florentine Francesco Leoni and continued until August 1836. On September 1, the new theater called royal Dante theatre was inaugurated with La Sonnambula by Vincenzo Bellini. The name of the theater was chosen to pay tribute to one of the most important poets of Italy, the florentine Dante Alighieri.

=== The restoration and the movie theater ===
In the 1950s, the theater began to show films. Following the Second World War, the academy resumed full control of the theater, valuing it as a movie theater. Luigi Monti, the Regia Aeronautica pilot in World War II, largely contributed to the reorganization of the theater and the academy, adapting it to current standards. It will transform the academy in a society becoming the director-general in new business. The new company will bring as name "Academy of Risorti S.r.L." (literally Academy of the Resurrected ltd.). Until his death, Monti cured with love and passion the redevelopment of film programming and theater shows. From 1975 to 1994, they were carried out the first restoration of the modern age, driven by engineers Vittorio Landi and Perugino Perugini. Among the work carried out there is the renewal of the wooden chairs, replaced by red velvet chairs, the restoration of the paintings and interior decorations, the renewal of the floor of the stalls and its main structures.

=== Recent developments ===
To remain open, today the theater Dante plays an assiduous work as a movie theater, in order to propose periodically events and other kind of shows (like operettas, concertos and theatre season, and other live events). As a movie theater, uses the same policy, trying to offer various types of entertainment for all categories of users. The cinema was one of the first in the province in the 90s install the multi-channel digital audio, offering to the audience the sounds of Dolby Digital and DTS. The digitization process ends in 2011, when it was purchased the professional digital projector, that can offer to the audiences, 3D feature presentation movies and other stereoscopic contents.

== Description ==
Thanks to assiduous care, the theater space, even of medium size, has come to this day still intact with its neo-classical style, which makes it one of the most beautiful historic theaters in Tuscany. The theater is built according to the specifications of the nineteenth century Italian theaters, the main architectural features are the construction of the hall with a plant horseshoe, the elimination of the bleachers in favor of in favor of more box tiers, and the enlargement of the stage in favor of the new perspective wings. In the theater there are a total of 400 seats, divided in 190 seats in the stalls and in four tiers of boxes. There is also a small orchestra pit. Both the stalls that the stage has a little slope that is vanished in the area of pit.

== The Academy ==
The academy of resurrected, as we know it nowadays, was established in 1953, with the aim of making management activities of theaters, cinemas, and other opportunities for entertainment and education. The component of the academy are formed mostly by the old nobles family present in Sansepolcro. Over the years, academics have changed several times, acquiring or disposing their shareholdings in the company. A famous member of the academy was the family Buitoni. The statute of the academy expressed clearly that the company was created with the same intent of its ancient founders, and that any proceeds obtained will be invested to support the running costs and adapt the structures to the times. No academic earns money from the theater and its activities.

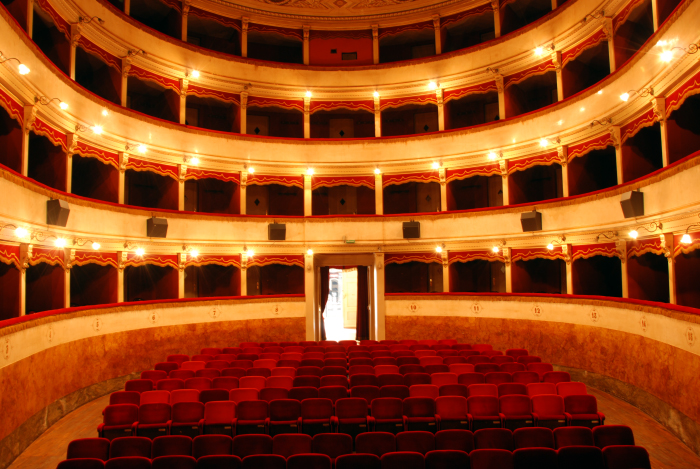
Internal vision of the theater.

=== The academics and the boxes ===
The theater Dante underwent natural transformation of small theaters Italian born largely in the Renaissance, which have been transformed from theater to multi-purpose halls. During the renaissance, the nobles of Sansepolcro manage this theater for personal prestige and to be able to present artistic and cultural performances to the entire population. It followed, as usual, that every noble had his reserved seat, away from ordinary people, according to his shareholding in association. The most prominent members were sitting in the most central seats, the others, hand in hand in the more laterals. The nobles didn't sat in the stalls, but they were on the upper floors, in the boxes. Originally it seems were not present even the chairs in the stalls, and that some performances were paid exclusively by the nobility to exercise more prestige in town. Ordinary people, in the early years it seems that should bring home a chair, if they wanted to sit. To remember the tradition of the boxes, still it reserves the "academic box" the number 8 box on the first floor that however isn't the royal box (called also the central box, the number 9 in second tier of boxes).

== Trivia ==
- the theater was used by Italian director Mario Monicelli for the shooting of the movie Rossini! Rossini! After much research, it was the only theater in the center Italy who was willing to remove the bulbs and put candles and candlesticks during filming.
