= Convento di Montecasale =

Building in Tuscany, Italy

Coordinates: 43.5912°N 12.1855°E

The Convento di Montecasale is a religious building in Sansepolcro, near Arezzo, Tuscany, central Italy.

The monastery dates back to 1192, when the Camaldolese built a small hermitage with a hospital and a hospice for pilgrims along the road that crossed the Alps and the Marche. Given to St. Francis of Assisi in 1213, it currently hosts the saint's spoils.

The Franciscans remained there until 1268, when they were replaced by a small community of hermits who followed the rule of Saint Augustine.

Since the early 16th century, the Capuchins have been residing in the convent.

The complex preserves the original layout of the oldest Franciscan convents, developing around a central cloister with big stone pillars and architraves. It is a remarkable example of poor architecture, made of local materials, inspired by the simplicity of religious life.
