= Eduino Francini =

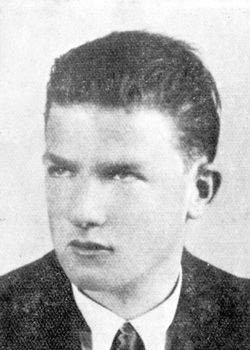
Italian partisan Eduino Francini (memoria.provincia.ar.it, CC-BY 3.0).

Eduino Francini (17 December 1925 – 27 March 1944) was an Italian partisan.

== Biography ==
Francini was born in Massa Carrara and grew up in Sansepolcro. He was the commander of a partisan company which played an important role in the insurrection of Sansepolcro (19 March 1944) against the Nazi-Fascist occupation. Some days later, he was captured and killed with eight comrades in Villa Santinelli (Umbertide), after a long fight with superior Nazi forces.

== Bibliography ==
- Enzo Gradassi, Ezio Raspanti (1998). Prigionieri ad Anghiari (in Italian). Arezzo: Biblioteca Città di Arezzo. ISBN 88-8024-037-4.
- Giovanni Ugolini (2001) [1945]. È passata la rovina a Sansepolcro. Cronaca cittadina dall'8 settembre 1943 al 3 settembre 1944 (in Italian). Sansepolcro: Grafiche Borgo.
- Andrea Bertocci (24 June 2007). "L'insurrezione popolare di Sansepolcro e la battaglia di Villa Santinelli" (PDF). Patria Indipendente (in Italian) (6): X–XI.
- Catia Del Furia (March 2003). "La lapide di Villa Santinelli". L'Altrapagina (in Italian).
- Luca Madrignani (21 October 2007). "Insurrezione e lotta armata a Sansepolcro" (PDF). Patria Indipendente (in Italian): 25–27. Archived from the original (PDF) on 11 July 2009.
- "La vita di Eduino Francini". Provincia di Arezzo - Progetto Memoria (in Italian). Archived from the original on 6 January 2014.
- "Eduino Francini - Decorazioni". Provincia di Arezzo - Progetto Memoria (in Italian). Archived from the original on 6 January 2014.
