= Raffaello Schiaminossi =

Italian painter

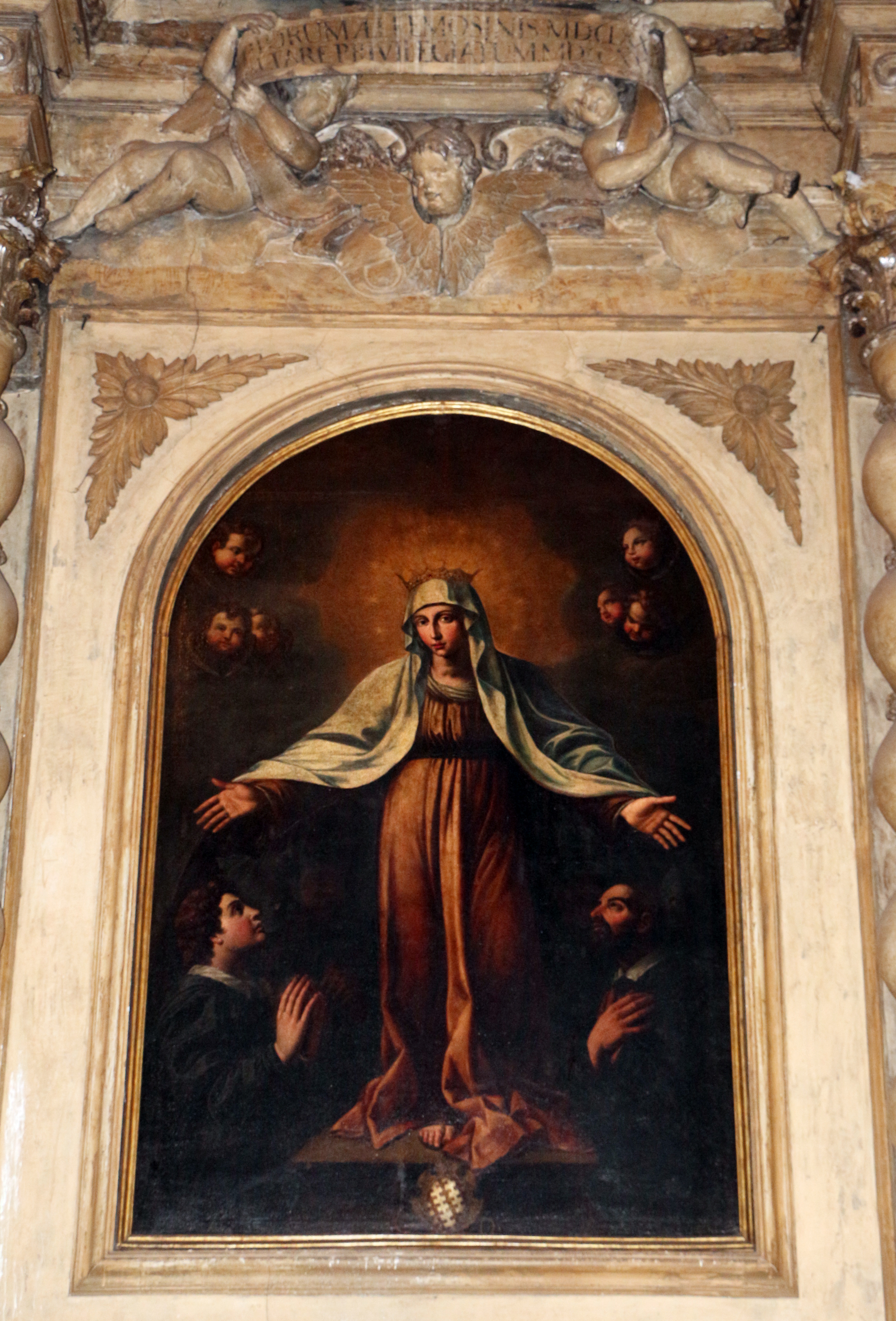
Our Lady of Mercy, Sansepolcro Cathedral

Raffaello Schiaminossi (1572–1622) was an Italian engraver and painter of the late- Mannerist and early-Baroque period, active mainly in Tuscany.

He was born and died in Sansepolcro, and engraved works after Cornelis Cort, Federico Barocci, and Ventura Salimbeni. The latter provided some of the designs for his voluminous collection of engravings titled Quindecim Mysteria Rosarii Beatæ Mariæ Virginis ("The Fifteen Mysteries of the Rosary").

A painting by an anonymous Italian artist that sold at auction in 2016 was found to have a support consisting of a partially cut Schiaminossi copperplate, the frontispiece to his set of etchings Twelve Caesars from 1606.
