= Saint Louis of Toulouse (Piero della Francesca) =

Painting by Piero della Francesca

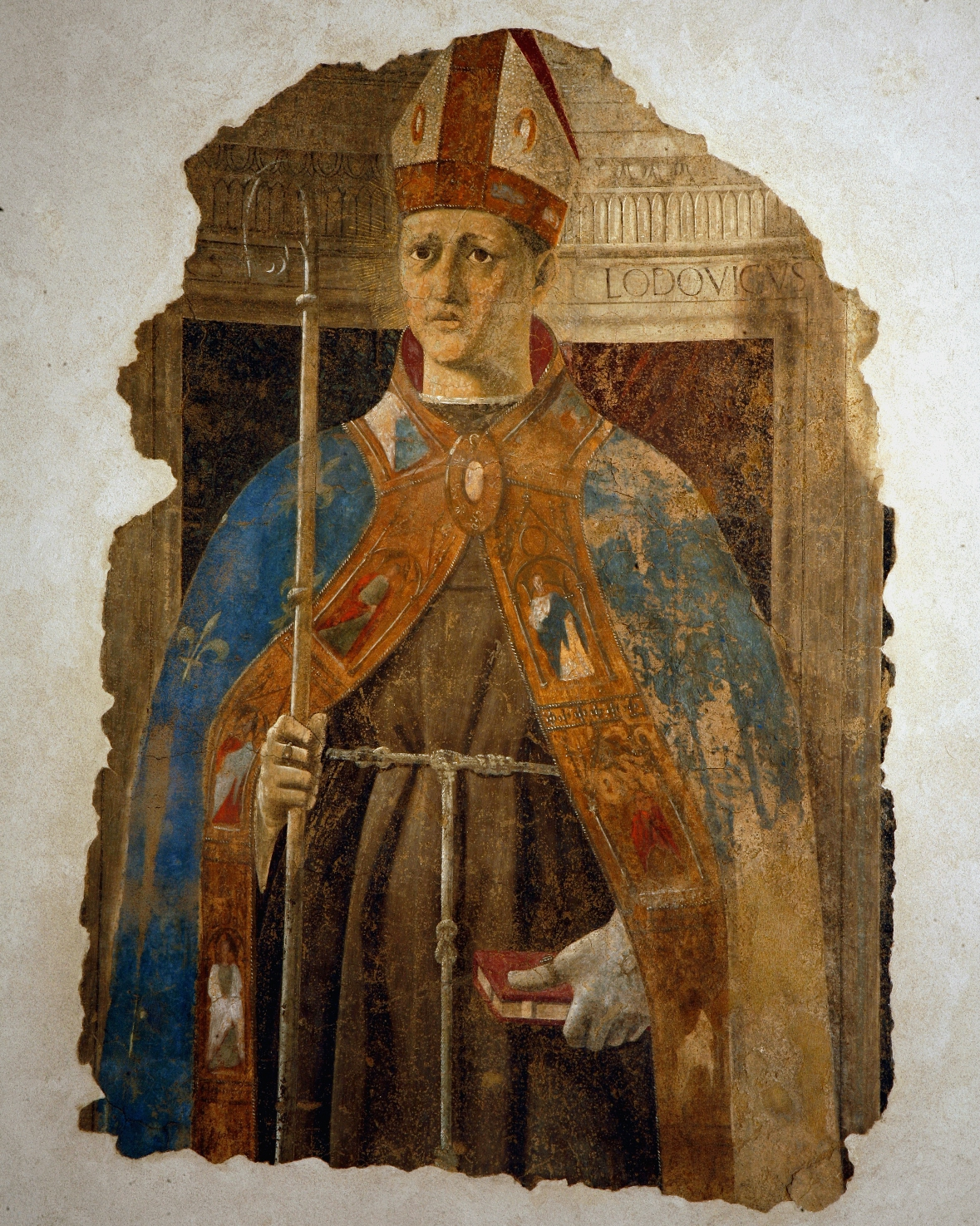
- Year: 1460
- Dimensions: 123 cm (48 in) × 90 cm (35 in)

Saint Louis of Toulouse is a fresco fragment of 1460 by Piero della Francesca, removed from its original wall in the former Palazzo Pretorio in Sansepolcro, Tuscany, in the mid-19th century, and now in the Museo Civico in the same town. The detachment destroyed a Latin inscription recording Ludovico Acciaioli as the commissioner and 1460 as the work's date, on the occasion of the town's revival of the role of gonfaloniere of justice.

The poor state of conservation has led to attribution difficulties in the past, with Roberto Longhi attributing the work to Lorentino d'Arezzo rather than to Piero della Francesca, but a 1998 restoration has revealed the use of volume and colour and reinforced its status as an autograph work by Piero. It follows the usual iconography of Louis of Toulouse, showing him as a young man in a Franciscan habit under episcopal vestments, similar to Donatello's statue of the saint in Florence. The vestments' edge is decorated with figures of saints in a similar way to the artist's Saint Augustine in Lisbon.
