= Santa Maria dei Servi, Sansepolcro =

Church building in Sansepolcro, Italy

Coordinates: 43.5692°N 12.1401°E

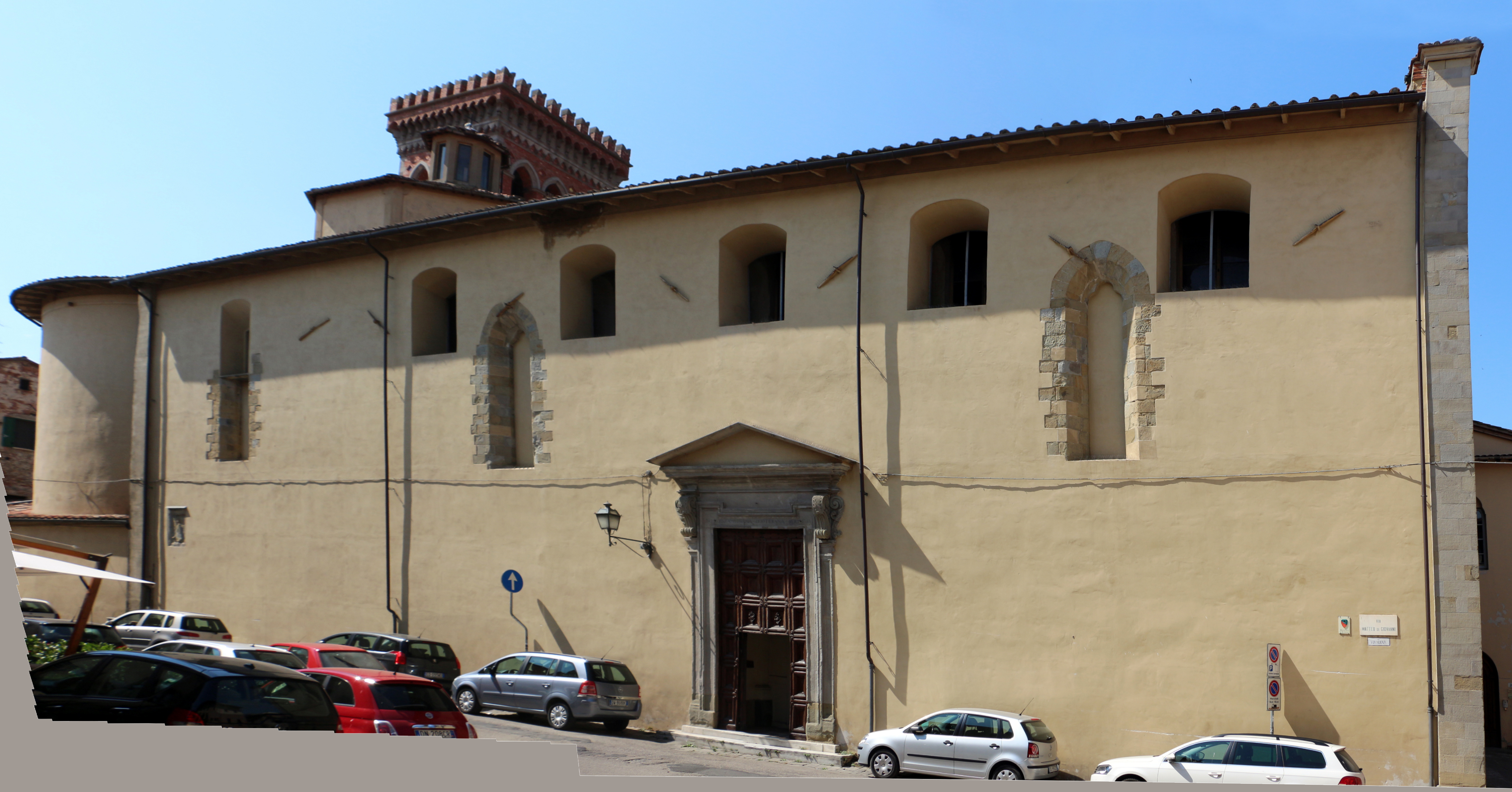
exterior of church

Santa Maria dei Servi is a Baroque-style, active Roman Catholic church and Monastery located in Via Santa Croce in Sansepolcro, province of Arezzo, region of Tuscany, Italy. The cloistered convent is still run by the order and operates a guest-house.

== History ==
The original church is from construction started in 1294, traces of this construction are represented by a few buttresses on the left side of the church. The church was consecrated in 1382. Between 1717 and 1727 the church underwent a baroque refurbishment, including a new facade and bell-tower. The church dome above the presbytery is unique in Sansepolcro. To the right of the presbytery is housed the Assumption of the Virgin (1487) by Matteo di Giovanni. The church also had paintings by Borghese Giovanni de'Vecchi. The Servi order was expelled from the convent during a portion of the 19th century.
