= Giovanni Battista Mercati =

Italian painter

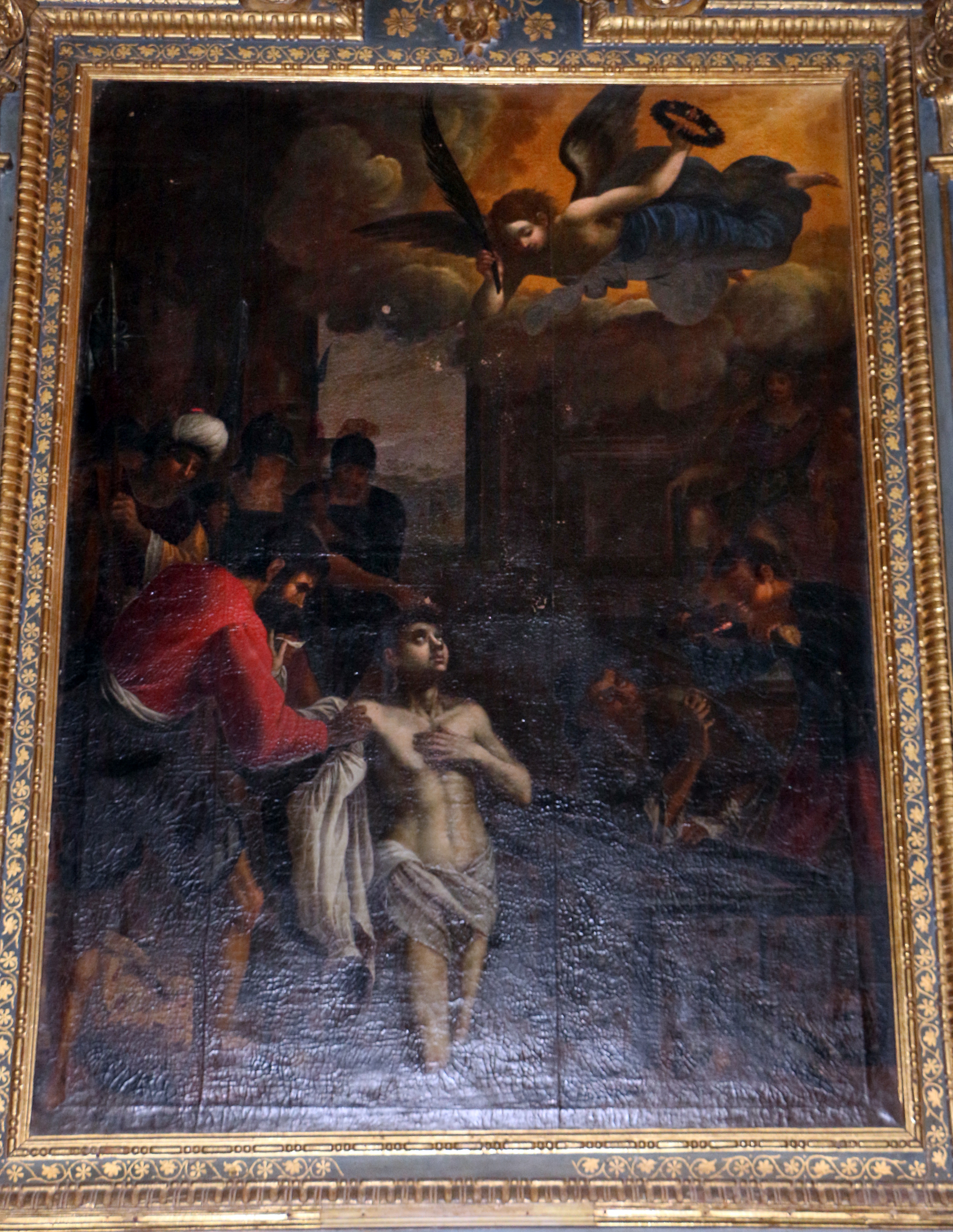
Martyrdom of Saint Lawrence, San Lorenzo, Sansepolcro

Giovanni Battista Mercati (1591–1645) was an Italian painter and engraver, active in a Baroque style.

== Biography ==
He was born in Borgo San Sepolcro, in Tuscany, but was also active in Rome. He is best known from his engravings, many made after other artists including Pietro da Cortona, Annibale Carraci, and other masters. He painted several altarpieces and frescoes in Sansepolcro, including two frescos on the Life of the Virgin for the church of Santa Chiara, and an altar-piece in San Lorenzo. He also has paintings in Livorno and Gubbio. Among his engravings are:

- Four antique figures from the Arch of Constantine, in the style of Giovanni Battista Gallestruzzi.
- The Marriage of St. Catherine; after Correggio.
- St Bibiana refusing to sacrifice to false Gods; (1626) after a fresco in Santa Bibiana by Pietro da Cortona.

One interesting set of engravings are his depictions of some of the extant Ancient Roman ruins in Rome, collected in an edition of about fifty-two plates, titled Alcune vedute et prospettive di luoghi dishabitati di Roma (1629) with introduction by Salvatore Settis, engraved in the manner of Israel Silvestre. The series is not a scientific depiction, but does capture some views at a time when kilns and sites were still actively dismantling the remains of ancient edifices. The prints may have influenced Vasi and later Piranesi. Some of the views, however border on being fanciful capricci. Among his engravings are:

- Title (with Medici Arms) and Dedication Pages
- Plate 3: Sant'Agnese in Agone
- Plates 4-5: Temple of Minerva Medica near Santa Bibiana
- Plate 6: I trofei di Mario ( Trophies of Marius)
- Plates 7 -10: Baths of Diocletian
- Plates 11-12: Below San Pietro in Vincoli
- Plate 13: Veduta from the Amphitheater towards San Stefano Rotondo)
- Plates 14-15: Near the Navicella Fountain
- Plate 16: From Suburra to Santa Maria Maggiore from the Piazza degli Zingari
- Plates 17-18: Camp Vaccino (Roman Forum)
- Plate 19: Towards Santa Maria della Consolazione
- Plate 20: Temple of Peace
- Plate 21: Depiction of Santa Maria Nova
- Plate 22: Below Santi Giovanni e Paolo
- Plate 23: Trajan’s Column
- Plate 24: Antonine Column
- Plate 25: Palazzo Madama
- Plate 26: Cortille del Cardinal di Fiorenza Leone XI (Courtyard of the Cardinal of Florence Leo XI)
- Plate 27: Temple del Sole d’Oreliano (Aurelian Temple of the Sol Invictus)
- Plate 28 Porta di Cavalleggieri
- Plate 29 Castel Sant’Angelo
- Plate 30 A St. Giorgio doux pagatano i Soldati Romani (At San Giorgio, Where They Paid the Roman Soldiers)
- Plate 31: Below Santa Sabina
- Plate 32: Ponto resto di Santa Maria (Remains of the Santa Maria Bridge or Ponte Rotto)
- Plates 33-34, 36-39: Pallazo Maggiore (Ruins of Imperial Palace on Palatine Hill)
- Plate 35: Piazza che va a Scola greca (Piazza That Goes to the Greek School)
- Plates 40- 45: Terme Antoniana (Antonine Baths)
- Plates 46-50: Colosseum
- Plate 51: Fuori del Popolo a Mano Manco (Outside the Porta del Popolo to the Tiber River
- Plate 52 Sepulcrum M. Mallorum Chiamato Capo di Bove (Tomb of Caecilia Metella)
