= San Lorenzo, Sansepolcro =

Church building in Sansepolcro, Italy

Coordinates: 43.5704°N 12.1391°E

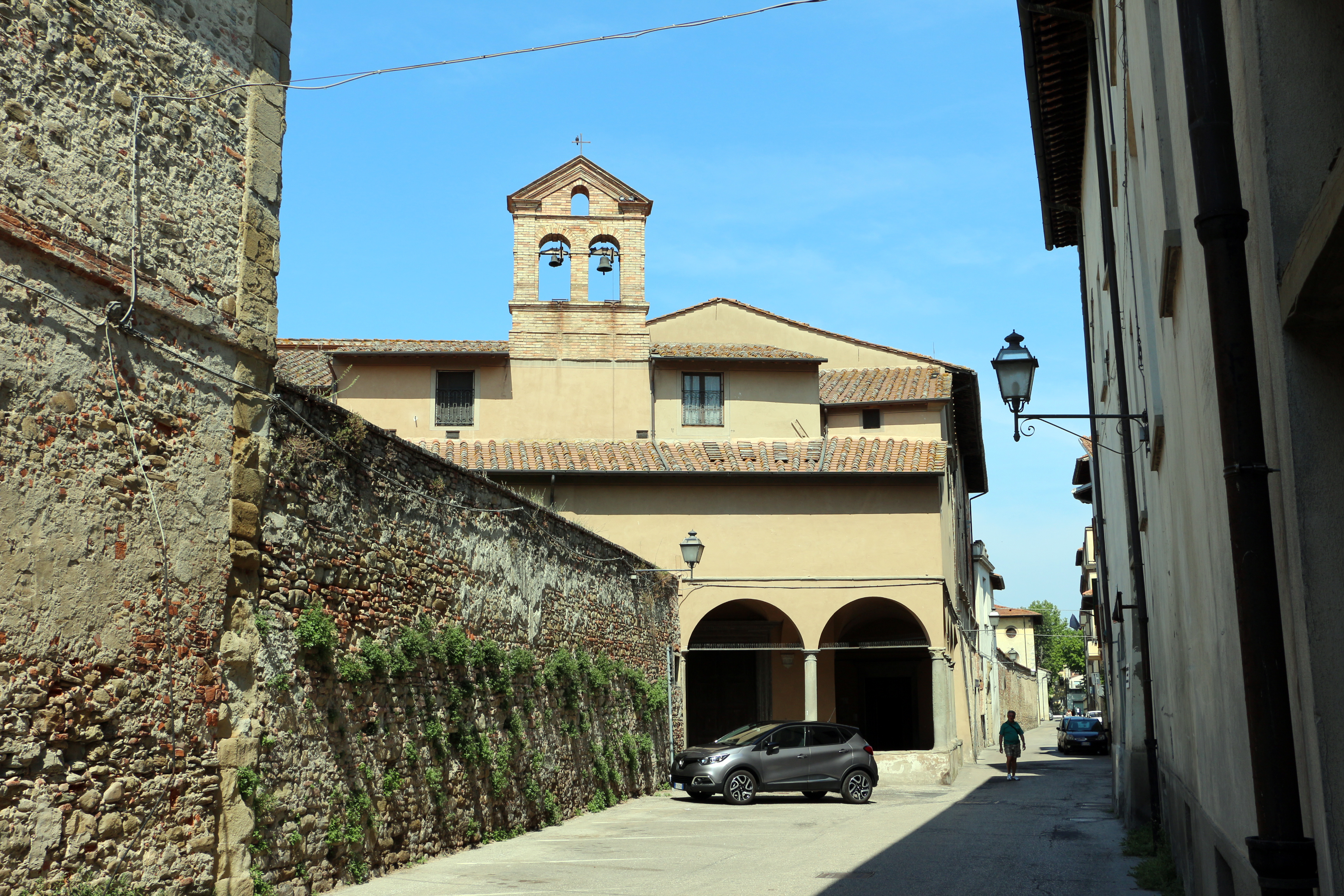
Exterior and bell tower

San Lorenzo is a Renaissance-style Roman Catholic church located at Via Santa Croce 2, at the corner with Via Luca Pacioli, in Sansepolcro, in the Province of Arezzo, Tuscany, Italy. The church is notable for housing a masterpiece by Rosso Fiorentino, the Deposition.

== History ==
A Benedictine Order church of this name was founded outside the city walls in 1350, but the present church, with its arcaded portico, was built in 1556. It was originally affiliated with the Confraternity of Santa Croce. The church was suppressed in the 19th century and for many years was used as part of an orphanage, where children were taught to weave textiles.

The main altar houses the altarpiece by Rosso Fiorentino. Another canvas in the church depicted San Benedetto by Giovanni Battista Mercati.

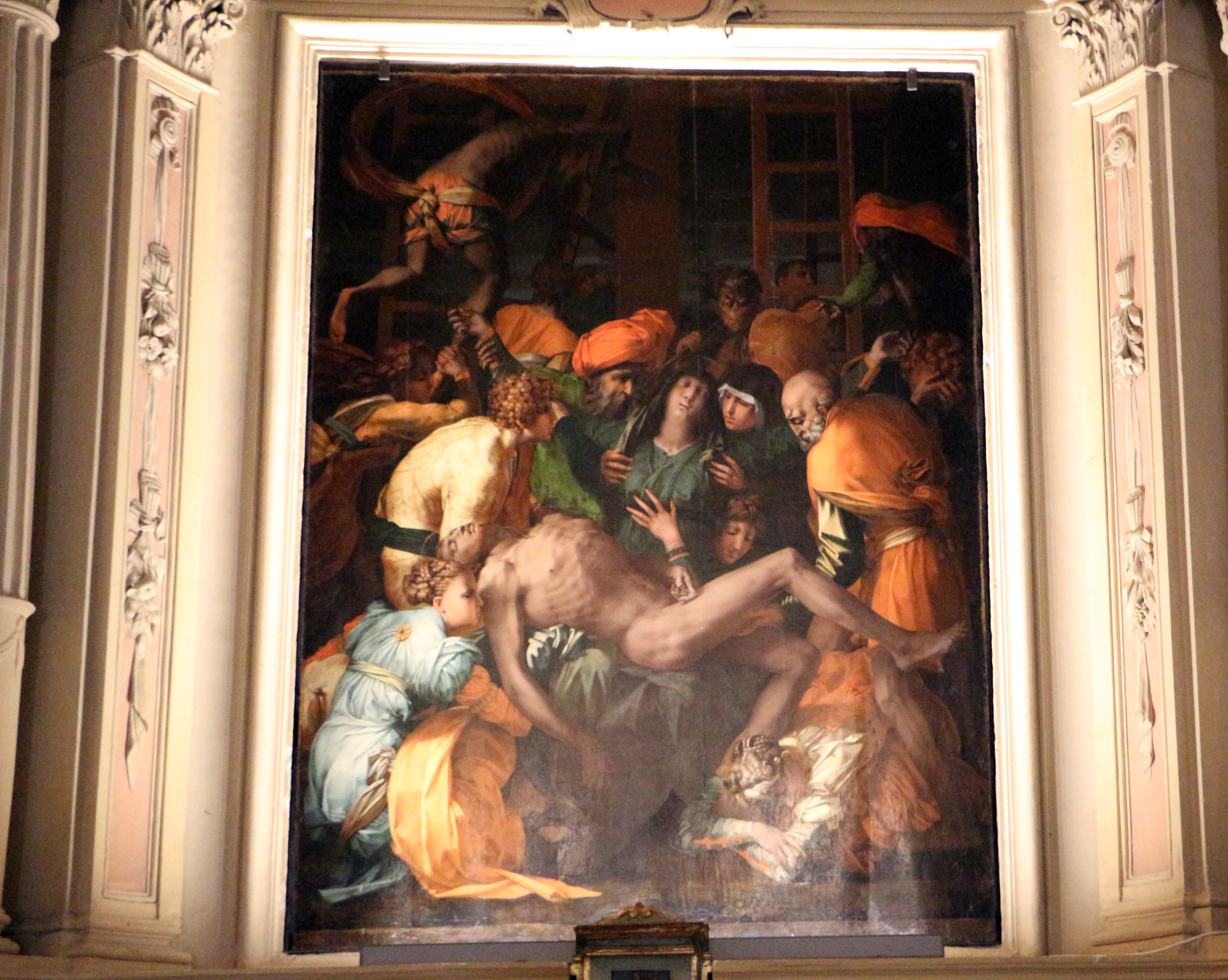
Deposition by Rosso Fiorentino

The Deposition canvas was initially commissioned by the Confraternity from Raffaellino del Colle. However, following the Sack of Rome (1527), which forced Rosso Fiorentino into exile, the commission was reassigned to him while he was in Sansepolcro. The recent upheaval in Rome likely contributed to the dark and turbulent atmosphere of the painting, especially when compared to Rosso’s earlier depiction of the same subject in his Volterra masterpiece. The Sansepolcro Deposition depicts a chaotic crowd surrounding the cadaverous Christ and his grieving mother, with monstrous or hooded faces looming in the background. By contrast, the Volterra Deposition presents a more intimate scene, focusing on the physical struggle of lowering Christ’s delicate body alongside the emotional toll of the event.
