= Sansepolcro Deposition =

1528 painting by Rosso Fiorentino

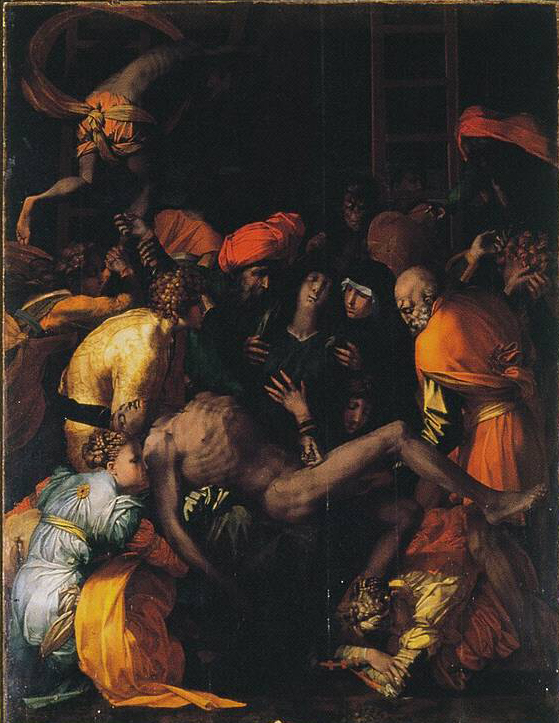
- Artist: Rosso Fiorentino
- Year: 1528
- Medium: oil on canvas
- Dimensions: 270 by 201 centimetres (106 in × 79 in)
- Location: San Lorenzo; Sansepolcro

The Sansepolcro Deposition or Sansepolcro Lamentation is a 1528 oil on canvas painting by Rosso Fiorentino, now in the San Lorenzo church, in Sansepolcro.

It was commissioned in 23 September 1527 by the Confraternity of the Holy Cross (hence its subject) for its altar in Santa Croce church in Sansepolcro. Rosso had arrived in the town shortly before this date.

== Bibliography (in Italian) ==
- A. Brilli – F. Chieli, Sansepolcro e i suoi musei, Arti Grafiche Motta, Milano 2004, pp. 32–36.
- Antonio Natali, Rosso Fiorentino, Silvana Editore, Milano 2006. ISBN 88-366-0631-8
- Elisabetta Marchetti Letta, Pontormo, Rosso Fiorentino, Scala, Firenze 1994. ISBN 88-8117-028-0
