= Late Gothic =

Late Gothic may refer to:

- A period of Gothic art also known as International Gothic
- A period of Gothic architecture, generally after the 14th century, such as Flamboyant (France), Perpendicular Gothic (England), Plateresque (Spain), Manueline (Portugal), Sondergotik (Germany and Central Europe), or Brabantine Gothic (Low Countries)

== See also ==
- Gothic Revival architecture
