= Sansepolcro =

- Comune
- Città di Sansepolcro
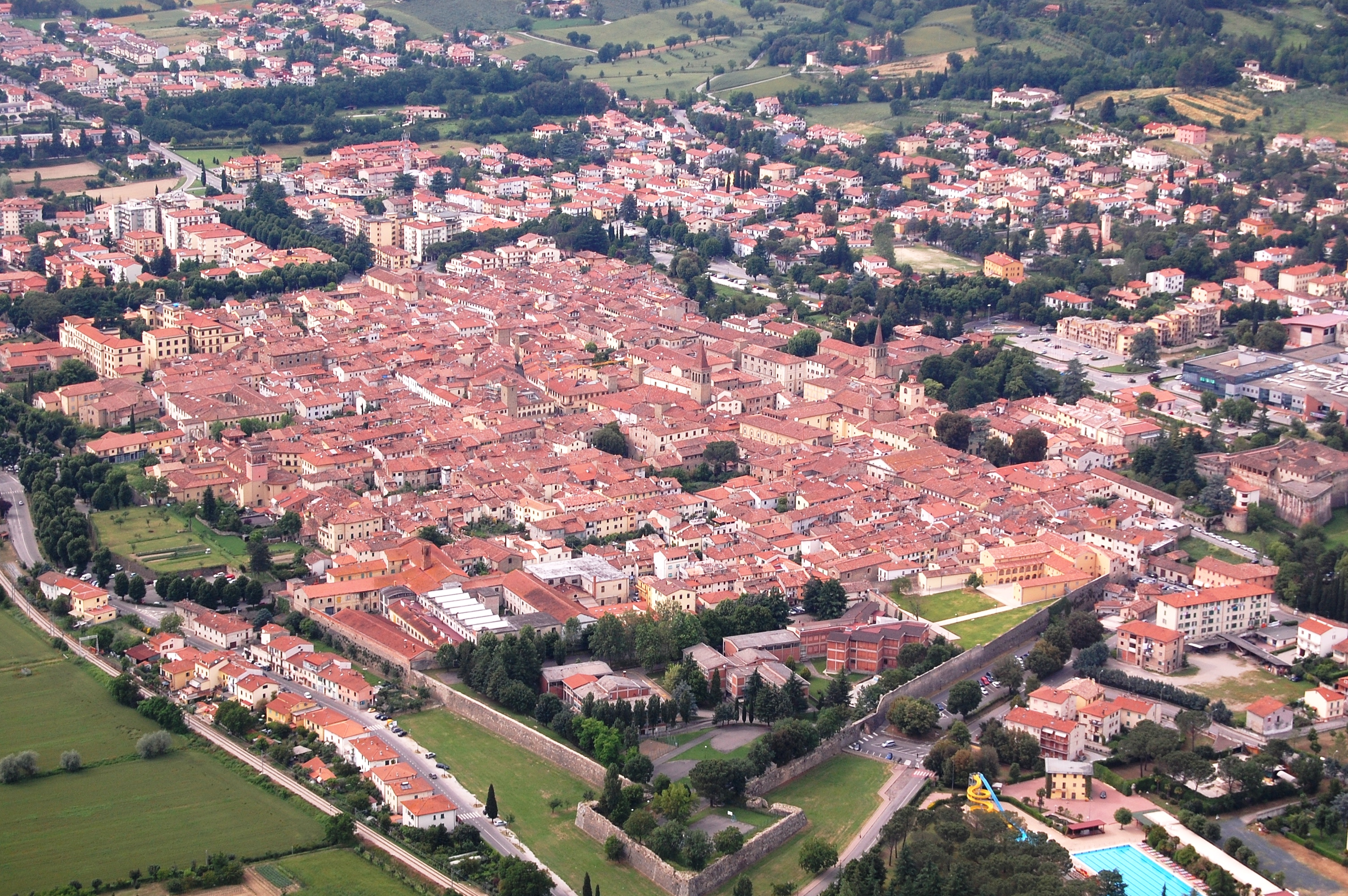
- Aerial view of Sansepolcro.

- Location within Italy Location within Tuscany
- Coordinates: 43°34′15″N 12°08′25″E
- Country: Italy
- Region: Tuscany
- Province: Arezzo (AR)
- Frazioni: Aboca, Gragnano, Gricignano, Melello, Montagna, Santa Fiora

Government
  - Mayor: Fabrizio Innocenti

Area
  - Total: 91.48 km^{2} (35.32 sq mi)
- Elevation: 330 m (1,080 ft)

Population (31 December 2014)
  - Total: 16,012
  - Density: 175.0/km^{2} (453.3/sq mi)
- Demonym: Biturgensi - Borghesi
- Time zone: UTC+1 (CET)
  - Summer (DST): UTC+2 (CEST)
- Postal code: 52037
- Dialing code: 0575
- Patron saint: St. John the Evangelist
- Saint day: December 27
- Website: www.comune.sansepolcro.ar.it

Sansepolcro, formerly Borgo Santo Sepolcro, is a town and comune founded in the 11th century, located in the Italian Province of Arezzo in the eastern part of the region of Tuscany.

Situated on the upper reaches of the Tiber river, the town is the birthplace of the painters Piero della Francesca, Raffaellino del Colle (a pupil of Raphael), Matteo di Giovanni, Santi di Tito, and Angiolo Tricca. It was also the birthplace of the Italian mathematician Luca Pacioli, and of Matteo Cioni, who translated Piero della Francesca's treatise about perspective in painting (De prospectiva pingendi) into Latin.

Today, the economy of the town is based on agriculture, industrial manufacturing, food processing and pharmaceuticals. It is the home of Buitoni pasta, founded by Giulia Buitoni in 1827.

== History ==
According to tradition the founding of the town came about through two 9th-century pilgrims to the Holy Land, Arcanus and Giles. They returned to the region and built a chapel dedicated to Saint Leonard, where they established a monastic way of life. The ruins of the chapel were built upon in the construction of the current Cathedral of Sansepolcro.

They had brought a stone from the Church of the Holy Sepulchre in Jerusalem (thus, San Sepolcro) with them from that shrine. It was installed in the monastery and was the origin of its name. It became a popular pilgrimage site. The church was raised to the rank of Benedictine Abbey of Sansepolcro (the Badia). The monastery was declared an abbey nullius.

The first historical mentions of Sansepolcro date to 1012, referring to the construction of the monastery, around which a commune began to develop. The settlement was declared a market town by the Emperor Conrad II, Holy Roman Emperor. The abbey chose to affiliate with the monks of the Camaldolese Order, based in the area, in the following century. During the conflicts between the Guelfs and Ghibellines, the town's factions were headed by prominent local families, including the Pichi, Bercordati, Graziani and Bacci.

Due to its central location on the local trade routes, in the 13th century control of the town was contested and seized by various forces of the region, passing from Uguccione della Faggiola, Lord of Pisa, to Guido Tarlati, Bishop of Arezzo, and his brother, Pier Saccone Tarlati di Pietramala, who ruled it from Città di Castello.

It last came under control of the Papal States. The local dialect derives from those of the Citta' di Castello and later of the Casentino valley. In 1367 Pope Urban V gave the town and its surrounding contrada to the Malatesta family, whose heirs ruled it until control was assumed by the Republic of Florence in the 15th century with the approval of Pope Eugene IV. It was raised to the rank of a city a century later by Pope Leo X.

During World War II, the town was saved from destruction by the efforts of Tony Clarke, a British Royal Horse Artillery officer who halted the Allied artillery attack in order to save Piero della Francesca's fresco Resurrection.

== Main sights ==
The main church is the Cathedral of St. John the Evangelist built in Gothic-Romanesque style in 1012–49. Other churches of note are Santa Maria dei Servi, San Francesco and San Lorenzo. The latter church has a Deposition by Rosso Fiorentino.

The English writer Aldous Huxley described the Resurrection by Piero della Francesca, which is in the Museo Civico, as "the greatest painting in the world". The museum collection includes three other works by Piero della Francesca and many other treasures including paintings by Santi di Tito, Raffaellino del Colle and Luca Signorelli.

== See also ==
- Convento di Montecasale
- Diocese of Sansepolcro
- Eduino Francini
- St. Quentin (Pontormo)
- Teatro Dante

== International relations ==
=== Sister cities ===
Sansepolcro is twinned with:

- Neuchâtel, Switzerland
- Neuves-Maisons, France
- Sinj, Croatia
