= Saint Augustine Altarpiece (Piero della Francesca) =

Altarpiece by Piero della Francesca

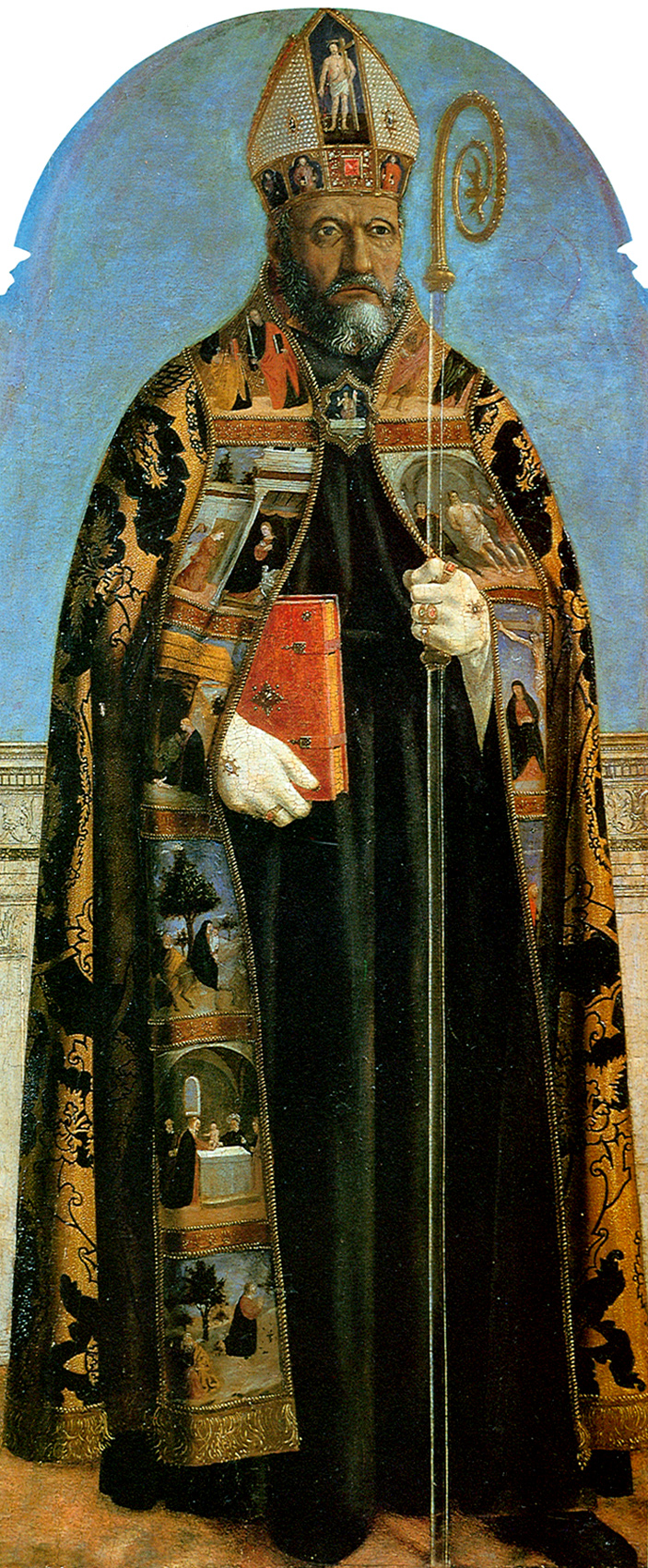
Augustine of Hippo, Museu Nacional de Arte Antiga, Lisbon

The Saint Augustine Altarpiece was a mixed-technique 1454–1469 panel altarpiece by Piero della Francesca, now split up and dispersed. It is thought that it contained thirty panels, of which only eight are known to survive, divided between five museums in four countries.

It was commissioned for what was then the church of Sant'Agostino (now renamed) in Piero's home town of Sansepolcro. The altarpiece reused an older Gothic framework, but was adapted so that the picture space of the main tier was continuous. The smaller panels use the older style of gold ground painting.

The altarpiece seems to have been broken up by the early 17th century, one panel being recorded in a collection in 1608. In 2024 all the panels known to survive were reunited, for the first time since at least the 19th century, at an exhibition in the Museo Poldi Pezzoli in Milan, running until 24 June. This was largely possible because of the closure for renovation of the Frick Collection in New York; this has four of the eight survivals.

== History ==
It is the artist's third known major altarpiece, following his Polyptych of the Misericordia (c. 1444–1464) and Polyptych of Perugia (c. 1460–1470). It was intended for the church of Sant'Agostino (now rededicated as Santa Chiara) in Sansepolcro. The Augustinians there signed a contract with the artist on 4 October 1454, with Angelo di Giovanni di Simone d'Angelo's signature and that of the artist. He received the last payment on 14 November 1469.

The Augustinians probably took the incomplete work with them when they moved out of the church. It was then completed in its new location before being broken into pieces, possibly during the 1550s. Separate panels are recorded in private hands in the early 16th century. In the first half of the 19th century the main panels of the work were in Milan, as shown by wax stamps on their reverses authorising their export from Austrian Lombardy and also the seals of a number of collectors from Milan. Towards the end of the 19th century, several panels appeared as separate lots at an art dealership, leading them to be split between a number of mainly private collections, which later passed to their present public collections or institutions.

== Main register ==
The four standing saints flanked a missing central scene, thought to have been a Coronation of the Virgin. To the right of Saint Michael and to the left of Saint John can be seen traces of the lowest step of the throne from the lost central panel, and on Saint Michael part of the Virgin's shoe. High on the sides of the same panels the tips of angel's wings has been overpainted to match the rest of the background. These make it likely that the central panel showed the Virgin kneeling at the bottom of a stepped throne, to be crowned by God, enthroned at the top. This composition was popular at the time, seen for example in Fra Angelico's Coronation of the Virgin in the Louvre (1430s).

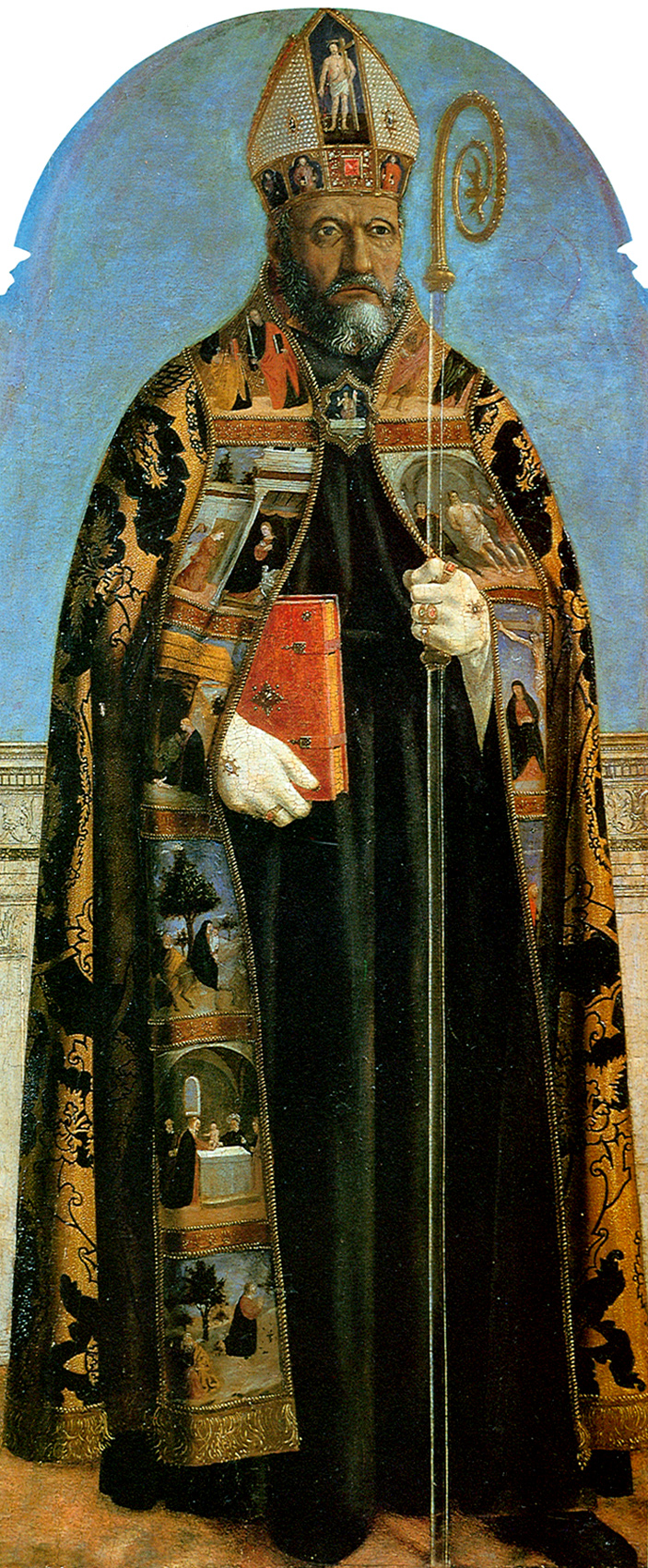
Augustine of Hippo (Museu Nacional de Arte Antiga, Lisbon)

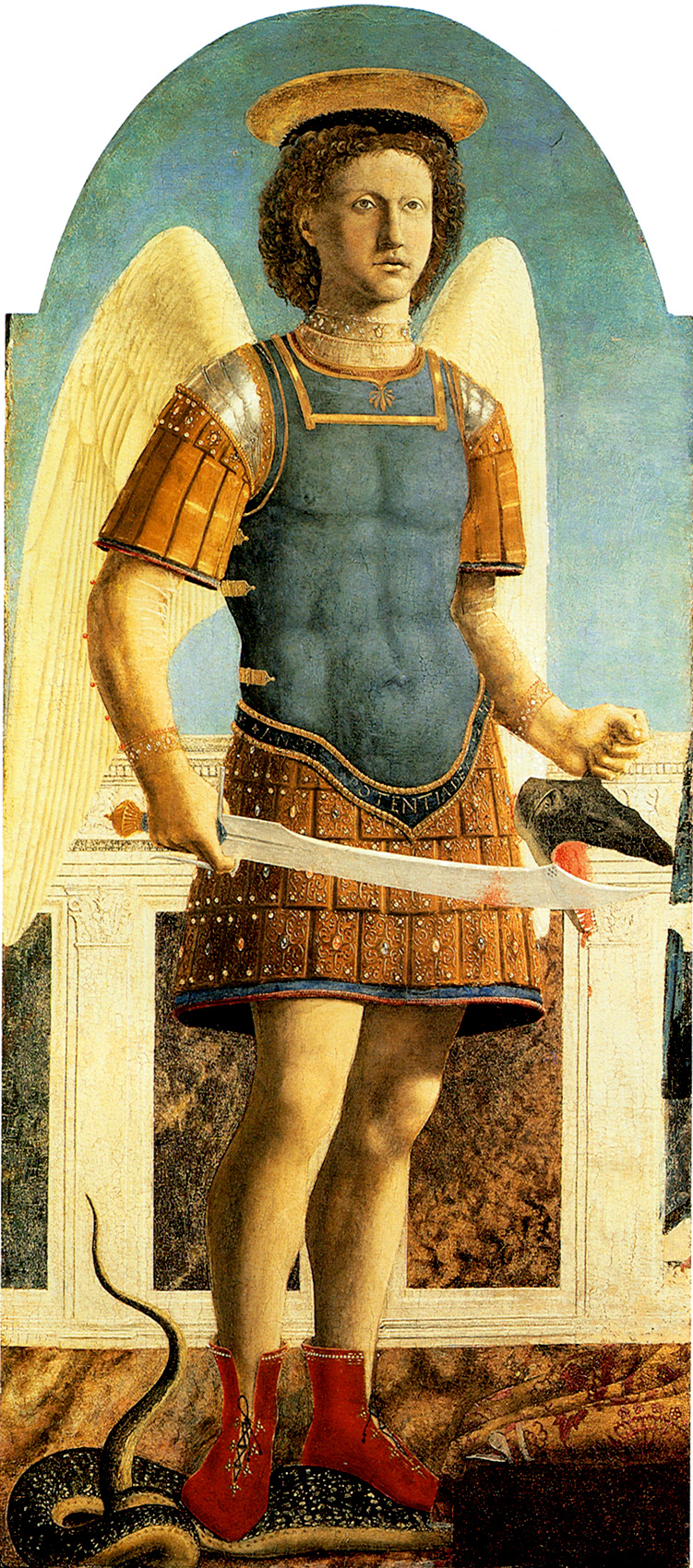
Michael the Archangel (National Gallery, London)

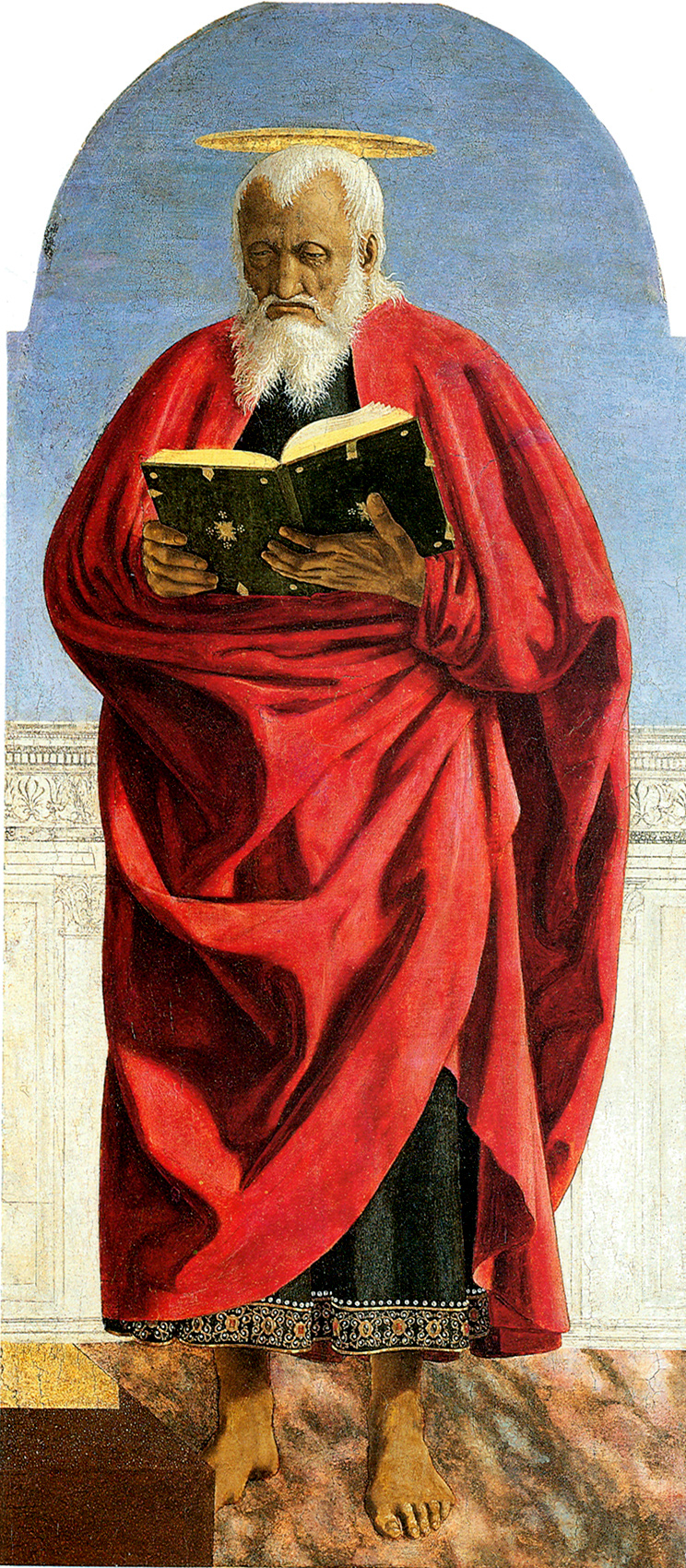
John the Evangelist (Frick Collection, New York)

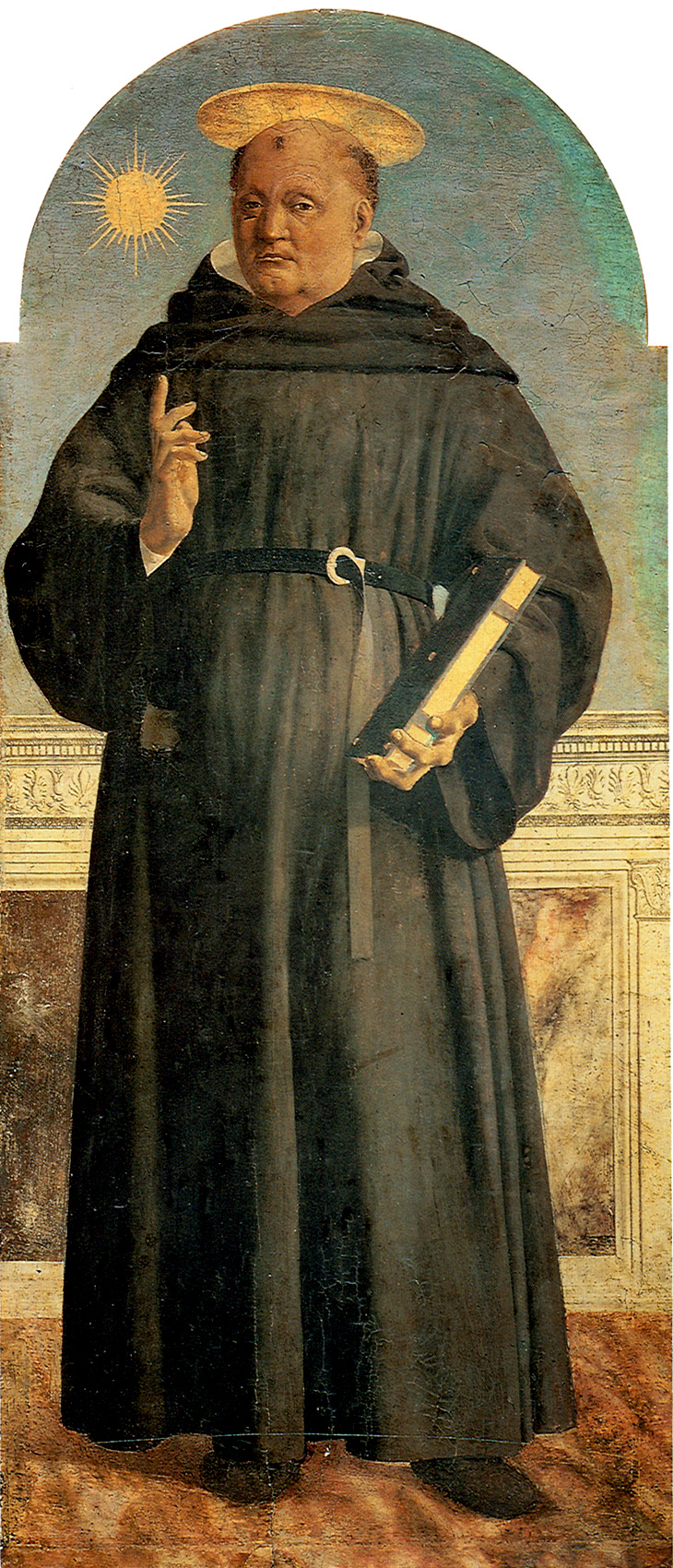
Nicholas of Tolentino (Museo Poldi Pezzoli, Milan)

== Smaller panels ==
From the predella, only a Crucifixion survives, cut down at both sides; the figures at the edges can be seen to be incomplete. The panels were probably as wide as the standing saints above. It is now thought that the three half-length saints were placed vertically within the piers at either side of the framework.

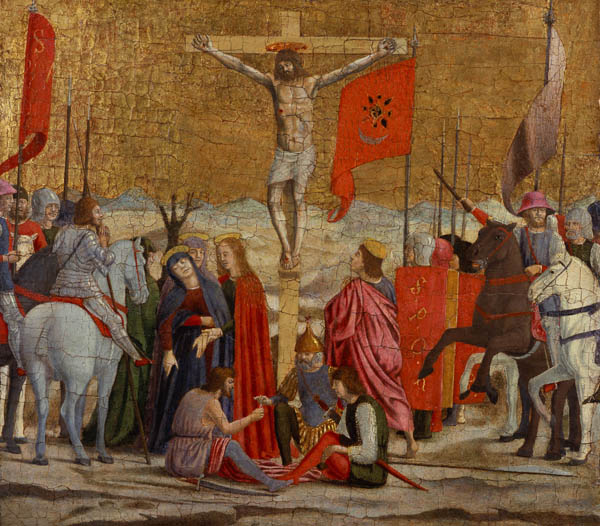
Crucifixion (Frick Collection, New York)

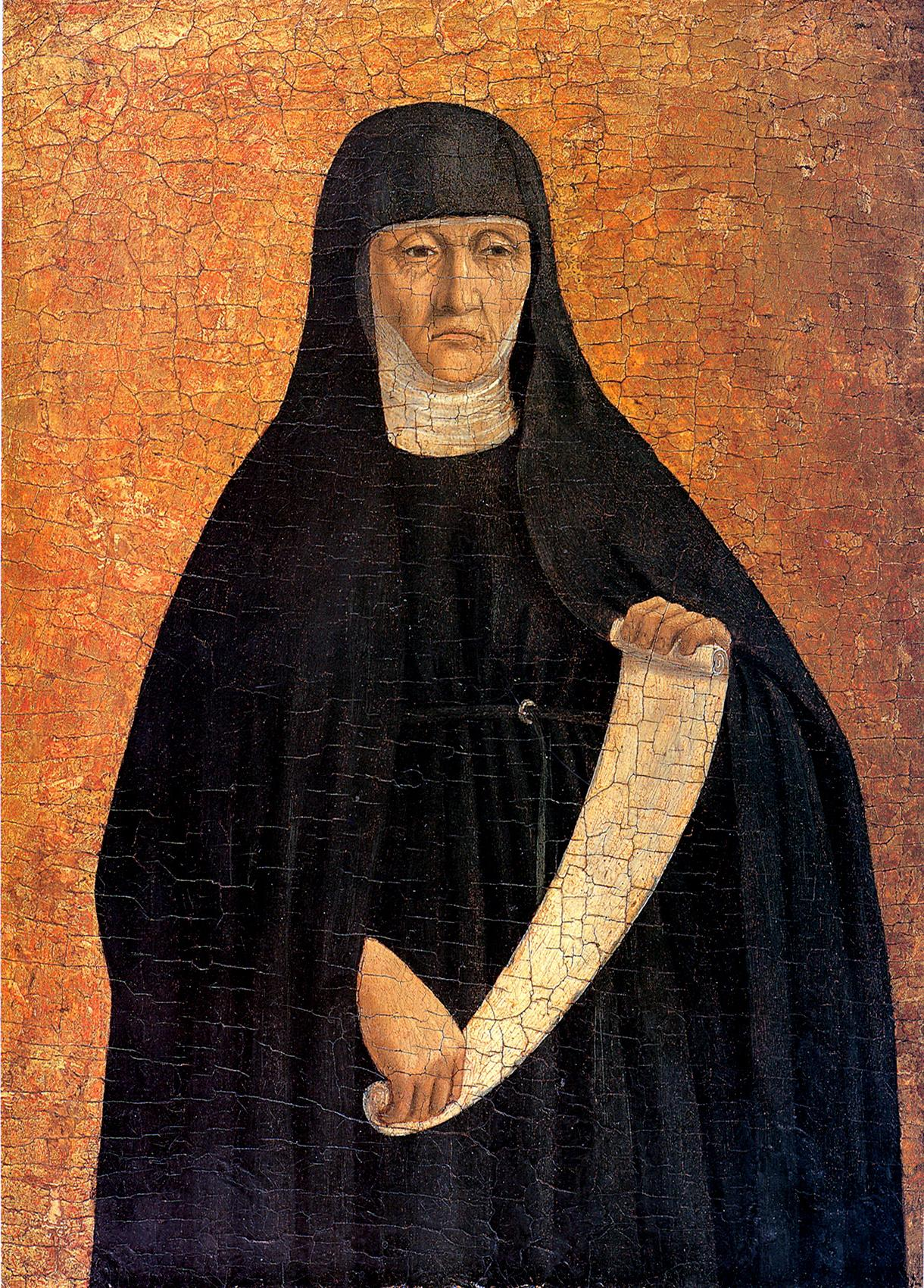
Saint Monica (Frick Collection, New York)

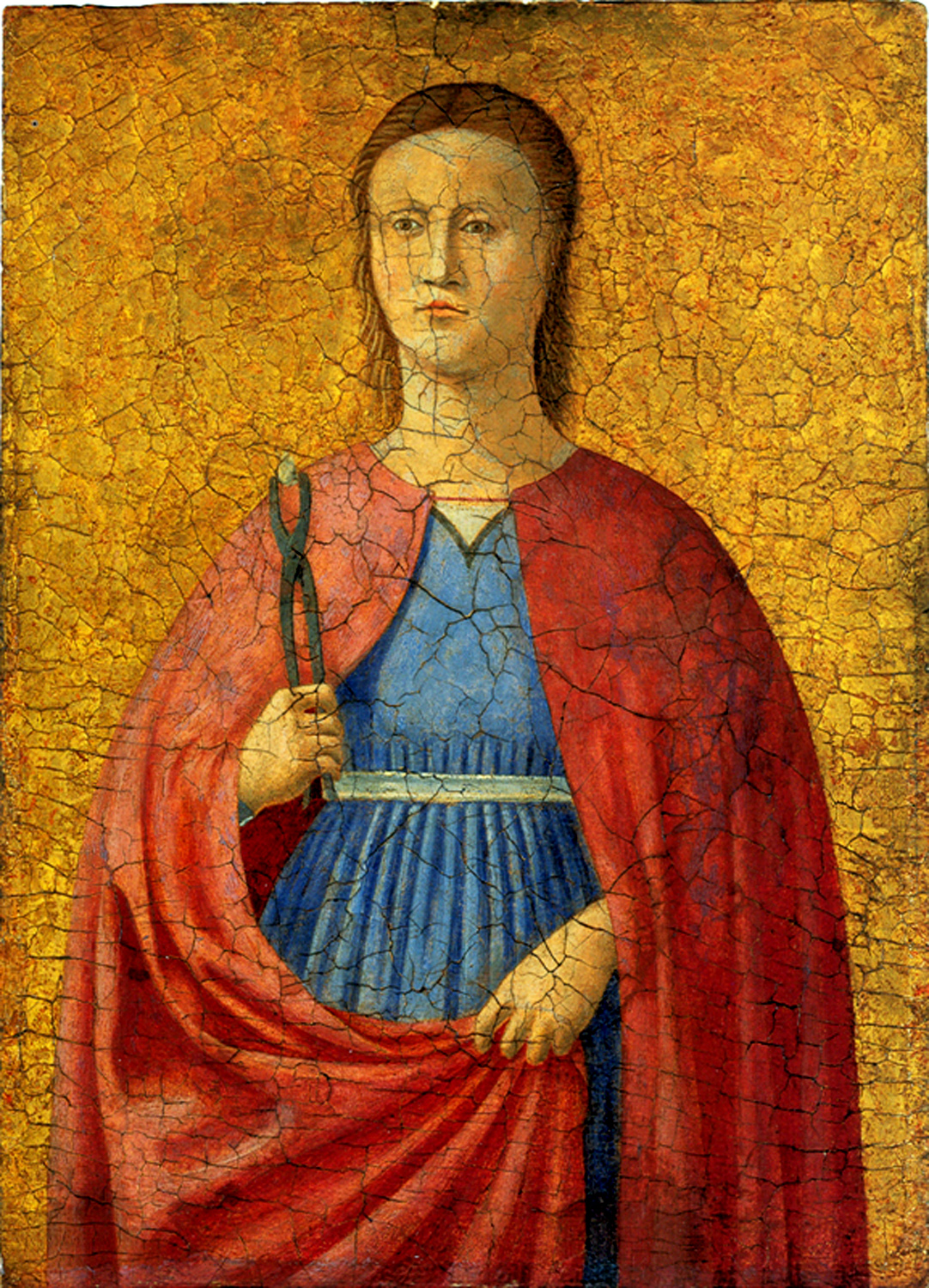
Saint Apollonia (National Gallery of Art, Washington)

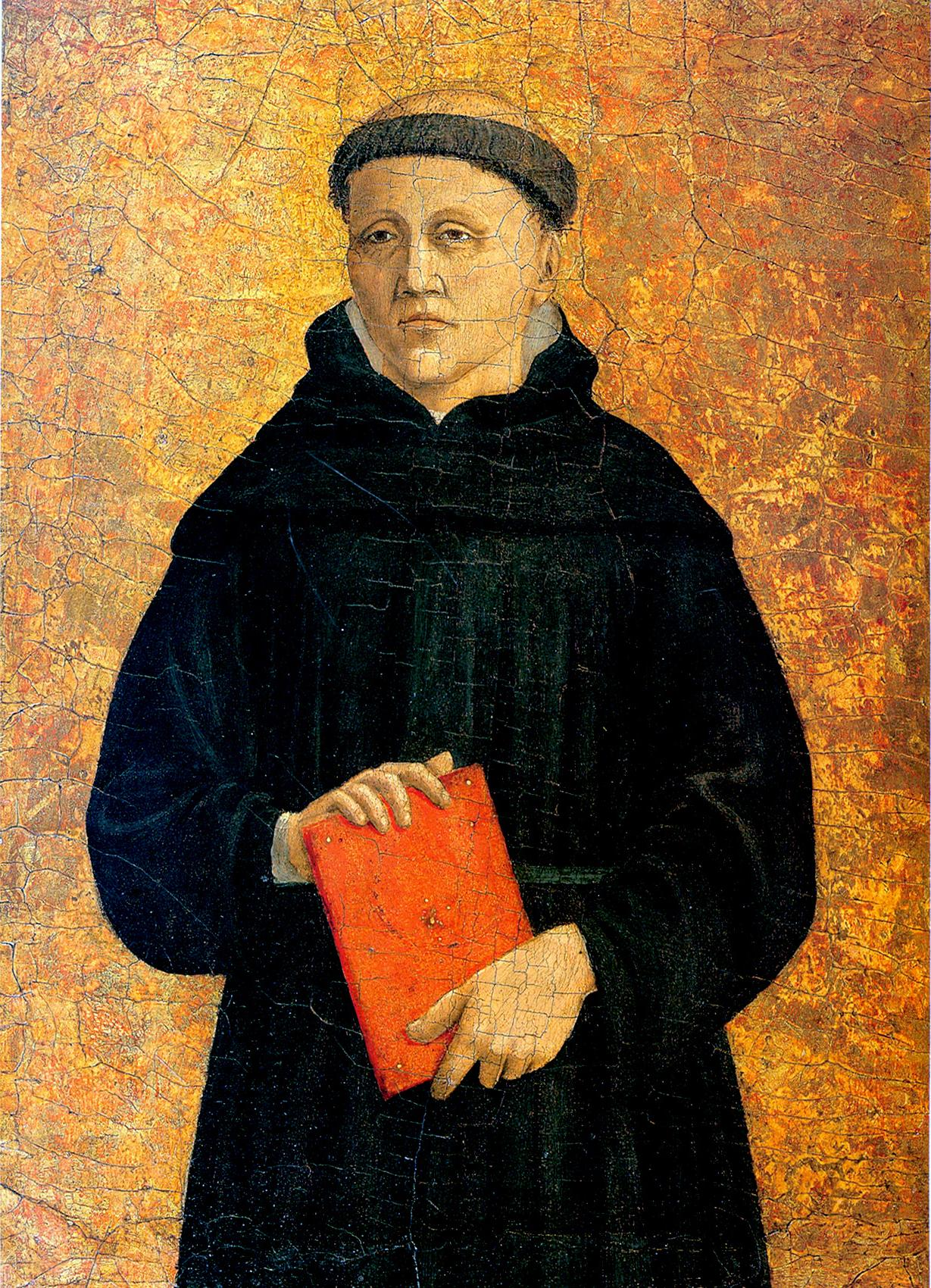
An Augustinian Saint (Frick Collection, New York)

== Probable reconstruction of the main tier ==
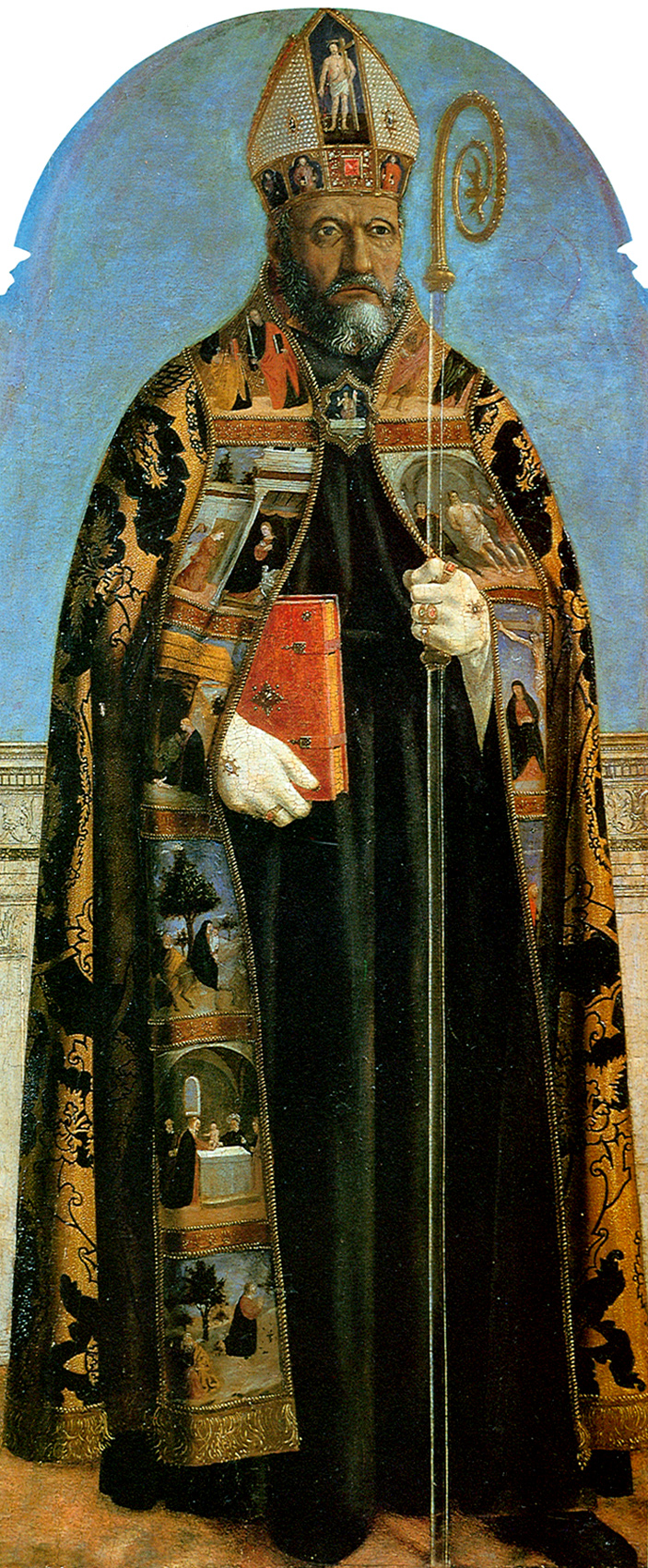

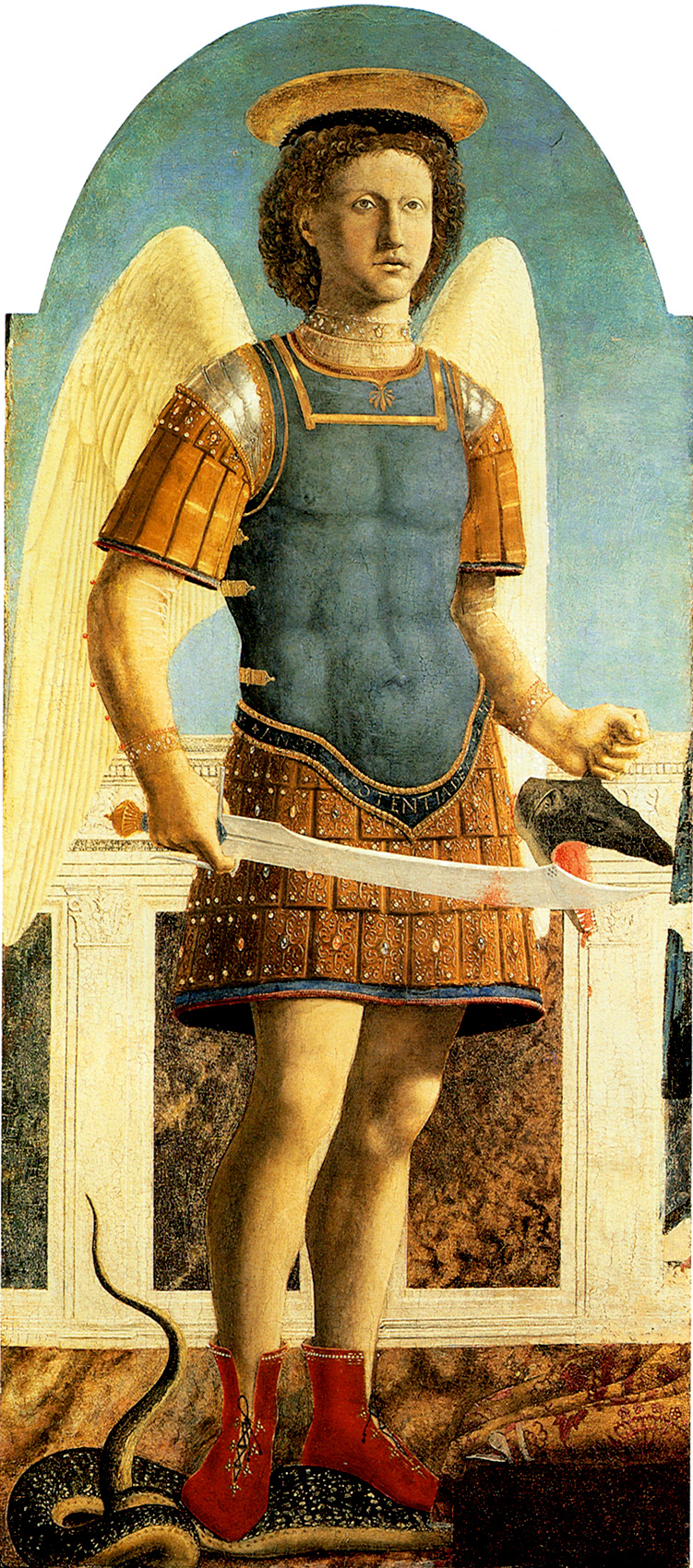

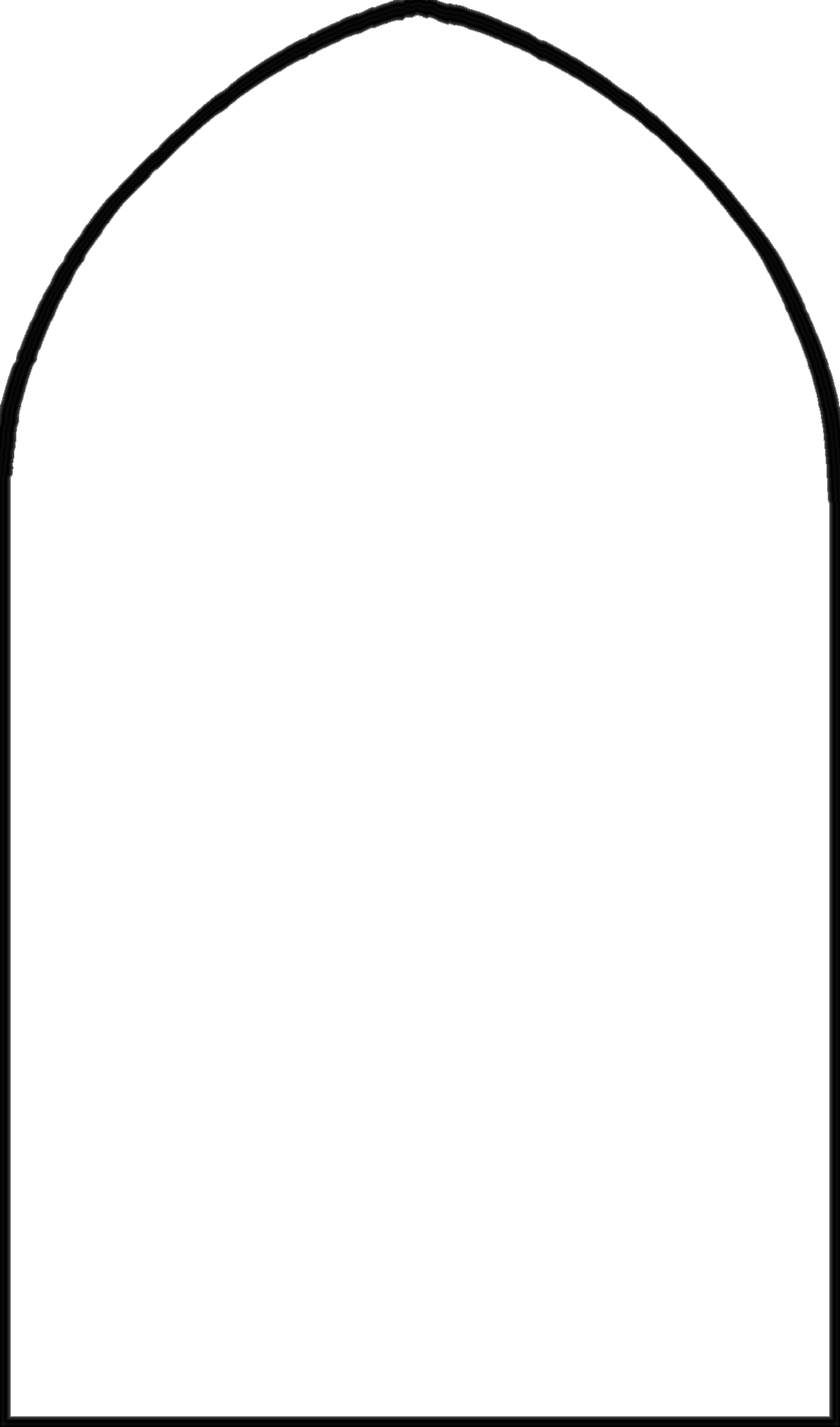

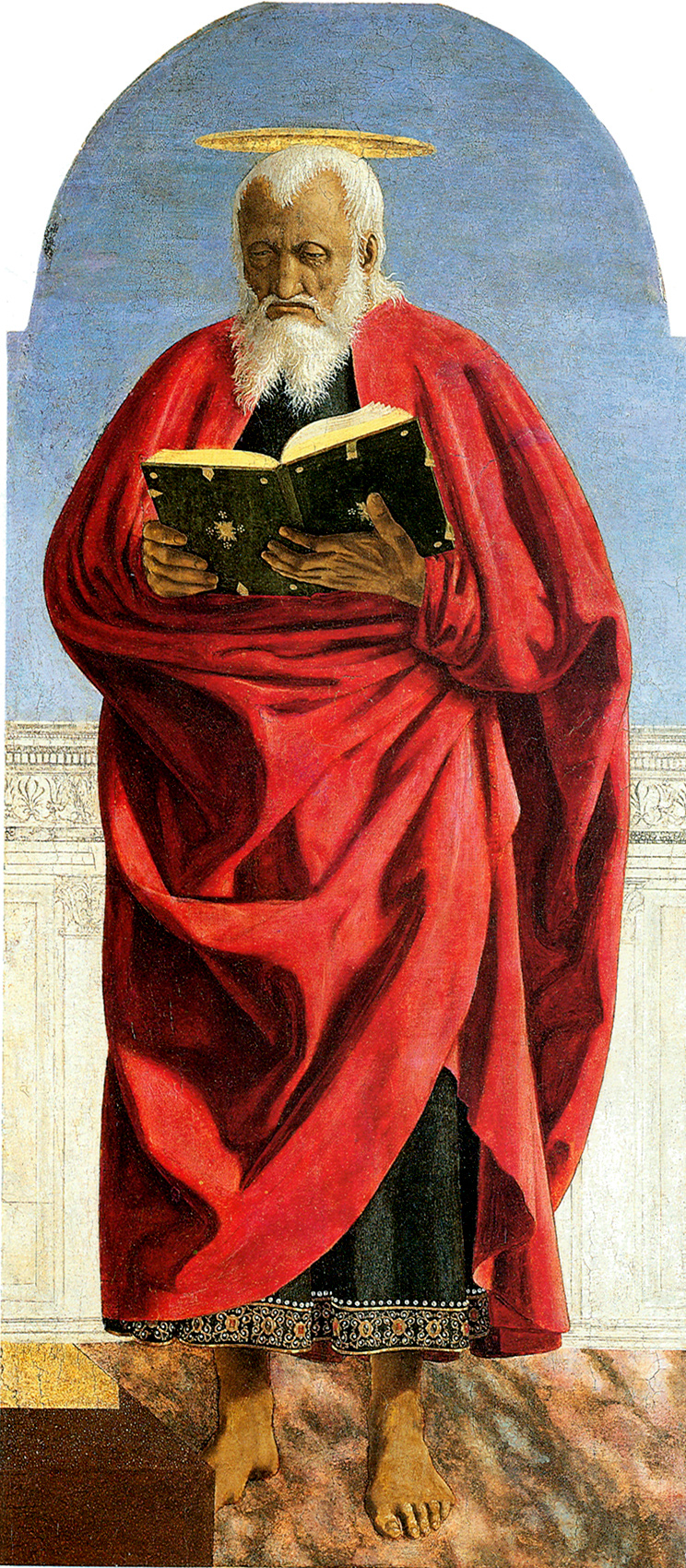

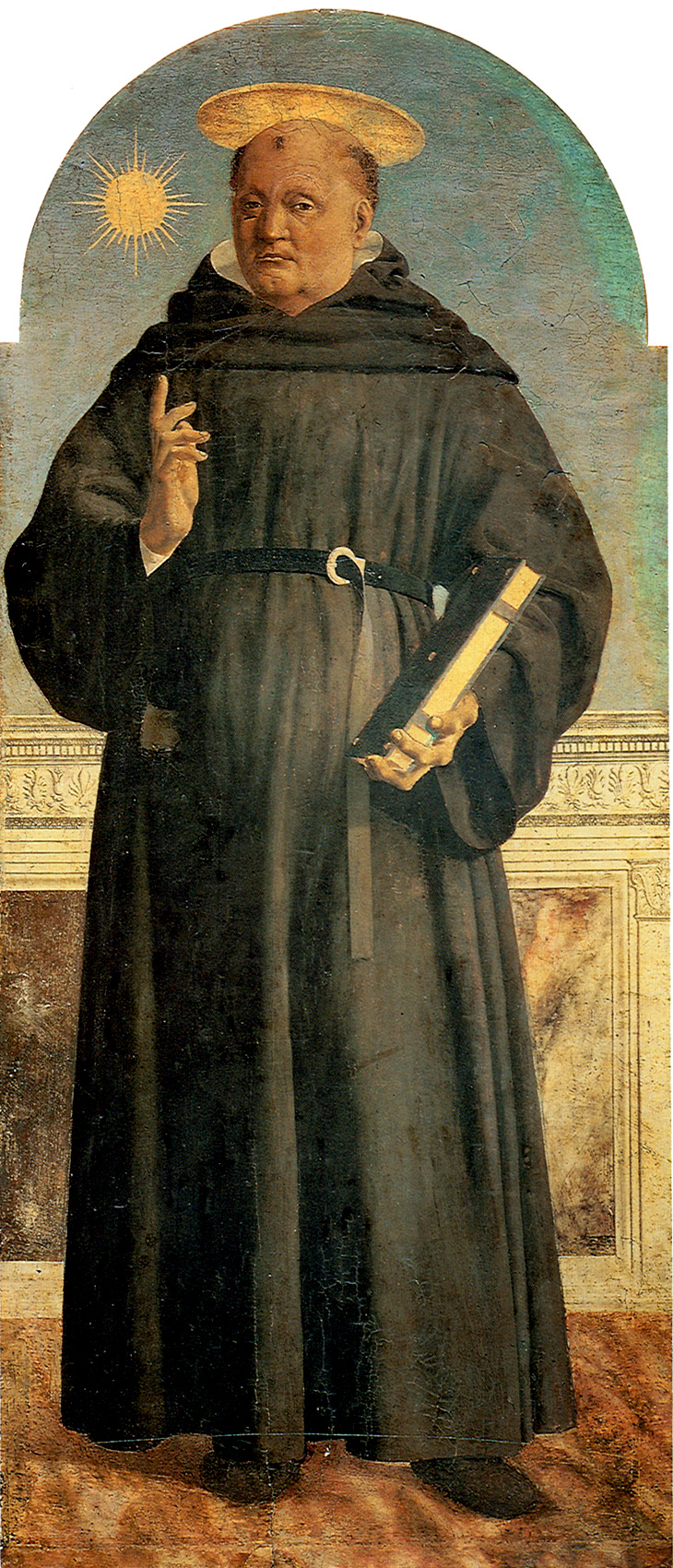
