= Piero della Francesca =

Italian painter, mathematician and geometer (c. 1414–1492)

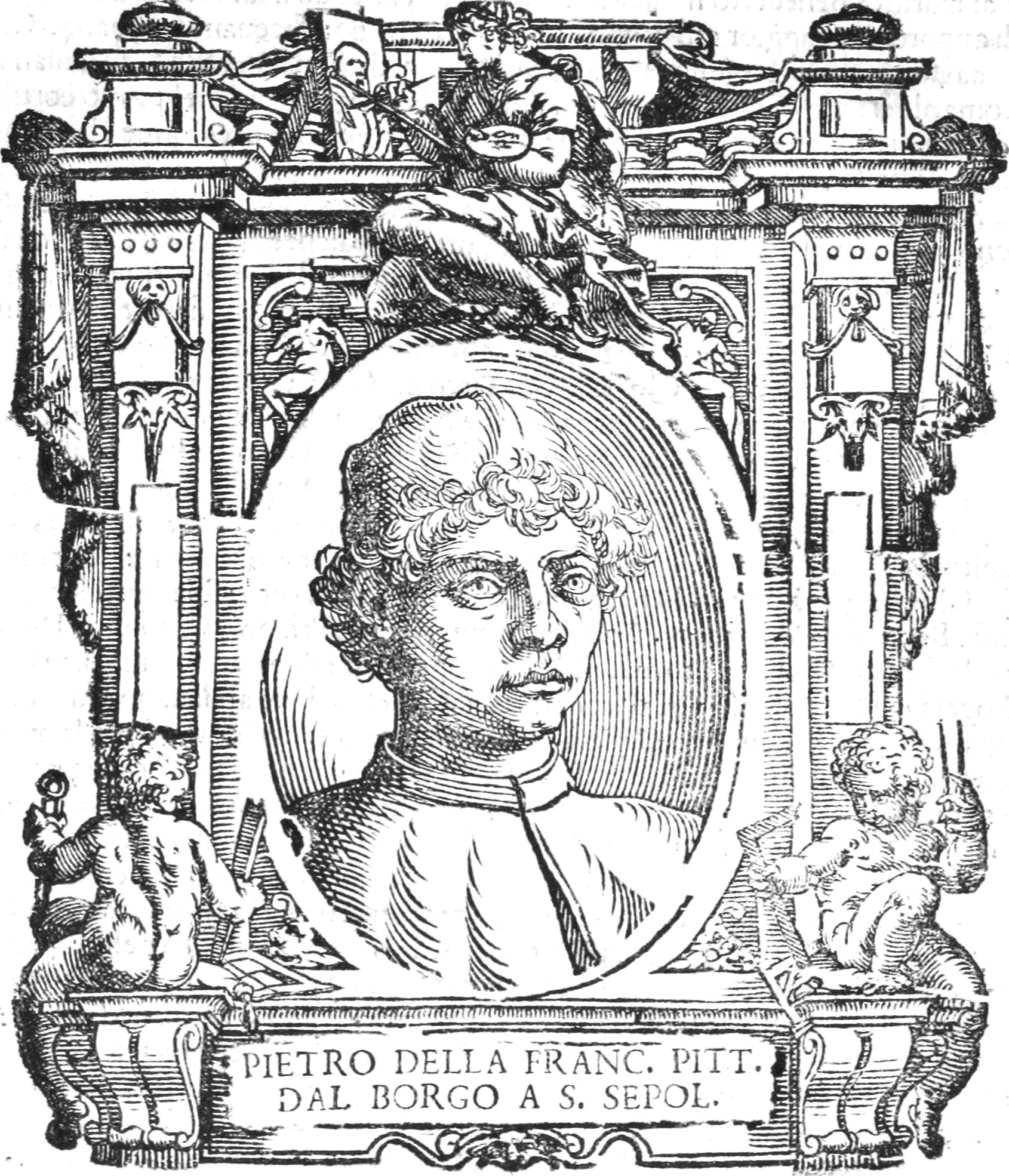
- Portrait of Piero della Francesca from a 1648 edition of The Lives
- Born: Piero di Benedetto c. 1415; Sansepolcro, Republic of Florence
- Died: 12 October 1492 (aged 76–77); Sansepolcro, Republic of Florence
- Known for: Painting, Fresco
- Notable work: The Baptism of Christ; Flagellation of Christ; Brera Madonna
- Movement: Early Renaissance

Piero della Francesca (/ˌpjɛəroʊ ˌdɛlə frænˈtʃɛskə/ PYAIR-oh DEL-ə fran-CHESK-ə, US also /- frɑːnˈ-/ - frahn-; Italian: [ˈpjɛːro della franˈtʃeska]; né Piero di Benedetto de' Franceschi; c. 1415 – 12 October 1492) was an Italian painter, mathematician and geometer of the Early Renaissance, today appreciated chiefly for his art. His painting is characterized by its serene humanism, its use of geometric forms and perspective. His most famous work is the cycle of frescoes The History of the True Cross in the Basilica of San Francesco in the Tuscan town of Arezzo.

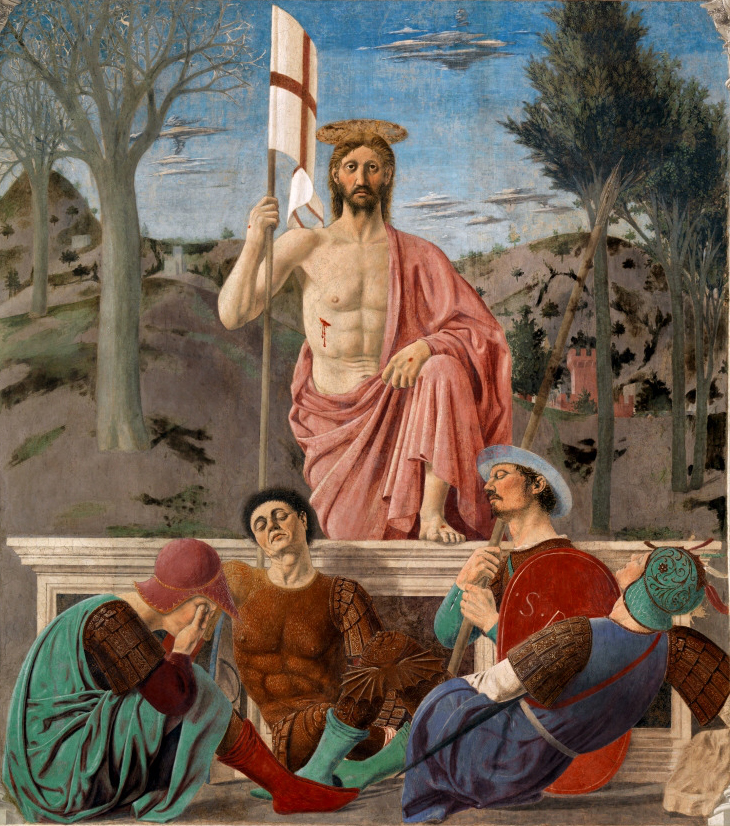
The Resurrection (c. 1463–65)

== Biography ==
=== Early years ===
Piero was born Piero di Benedetto in the town of Borgo Santo Sepolcro, modern-day Tuscany, to Benedetto de' Franceschi, a tradesman, and Romana di Perino da Monterchi, members of the Florentine and Tuscan Franceschi noble family. His father died before his birth, and he was called Piero della Francesca after his mother, who was referred to as "la Francesca" due to her marriage into the Franceschi family (similar to Lisa Gherardini who was known as "la Gioconda" through her marriage into the Giocondo family). Romana supported his education in mathematics and art.

He was most probably apprenticed to the local painter Antonio di Giovanni d'Anghiari, because in documents about payments it is noted that he was working with Antonio in 1432 and May 1438. He certainly took notice of the work of some of the Sienese artists active in San Sepolcro during his youth; e.g. Sassetta. In 1439 Piero received, together with Domenico Veneziano, payments for his work on frescoes for the church of Sant'Egidio in Florence, now lost. In Florence he must have met leading masters like Fra Angelico, Luca della Robbia, Donatello, and Brunelleschi. The classicism of Masaccio's frescoes and his majestic figures in the Santa Maria del Carmine were for him an important source of inspiration. Dating of Piero's undocumented work is difficult because his style does not seem to have developed over the years.

=== Mature work ===
Piero returned to his hometown in 1442 and was elected to the City Council of Sansepolcro. Three years later, he received his first commission, to paint the Madonna della Misericordia altarpiece for the church of the Misericordia in Sansepolcro, which was completed in the early 1460s. In 1449 he executed several frescoes in the Castello Estense and the church of Sant'Andrea of Ferrara, now also lost. His influence was particularly strong in the later Ferrarese allegorical works of Cosimo Tura.

The Baptism of Christ, now in the National Gallery in London, was completed in about 1450 for the high altar of the church of the Priory of S. Giovanni Battista at Sansepolcro. Other notable works are the frescoes of The Resurrection in Sansepolcro, and the Madonna del parto in Monterchi, near Sansepolcro.

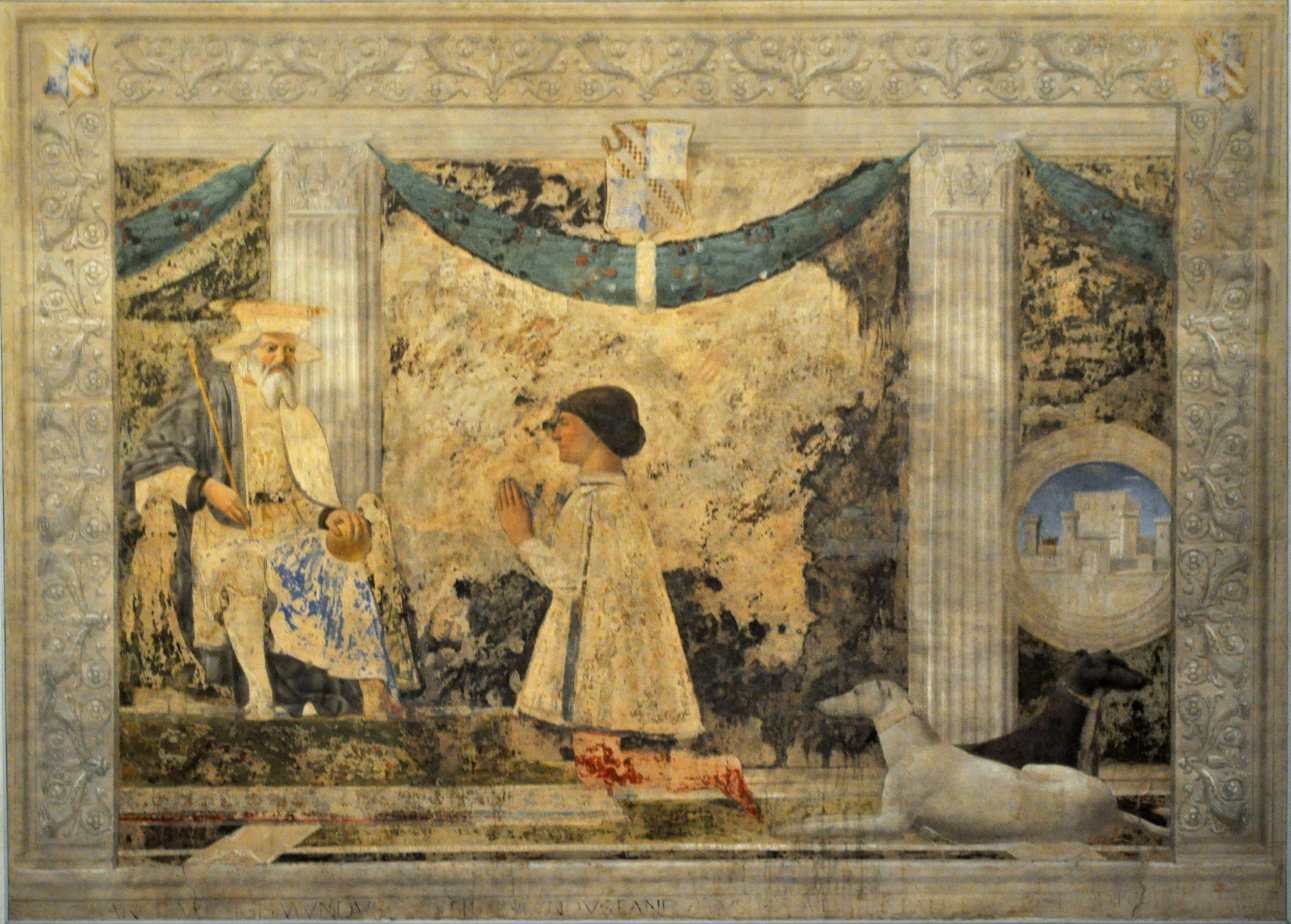
Sigismondo Pandolfo Malatesta kneeling before St. Sigismund (1451)

Two years later he was in Rimini, working for the condottiero Sigismondo Pandolfo Malatesta. In 1451, during that sojourn, he executed the famous fresco of St. Sigismund and Sigismondo Pandolfo Malatesta in the Tempio Malatestiano, as well as a portrait of Sigismondo. In Rimini, Piero may have met the famous Renaissance mathematician and architect Leon Battista Alberti, who had redesigned the Tempio Malatestiano, although it is known that Alberti directed the execution of his designs for the church by correspondence with his building supervisor. Thereafter Piero was active in Ancona, Pesaro and Bologna.

In 1454, he signed a contract for the Polyptych of Saint Augustine in the church of Sant'Agostino in Sansepolcro. The central panel of this polyptych is lost, and the four panels of the wings, with representations of saints, are now scattered around the world. A few years later, summoned by Pope Nicholas V, he moved to Rome, where he executed frescoes in the Basilica di Santa Maria Maggiore, of which only fragments remain. Two years later he was again in the Papal capital, painting frescoes in the Vatican Palace, which have since been destroyed.

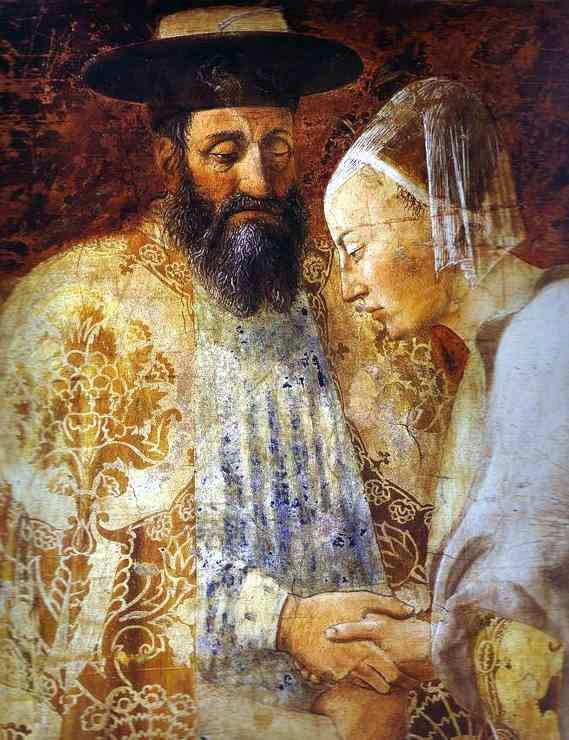
Detail from The History of the True Cross: the Queen of Sheba meeting with King Solomon

=== Frescoes in San Francesco at Arezzo ===
In 1452, Piero della Francesca was called to Arezzo to replace Bicci di Lorenzo in painting the frescoes of the basilica of San Francesco. The work was finished in 1464. The History of the True Cross cycle of frescoes is generally considered among his masterworks and those of Renaissance painting in general. The story in these frescoes derives from legendary medieval sources as to how timber relics of the True Cross came to be found. These stories were collected in the Golden Legend of Jacopo da Varazze (Jacopo da Varagine) of the mid-13th century.

=== Piero's activity in Urbino ===
At some point, Giovanni Santi invited Piero to Urbino, where Piero "executed several commissions for Duke Federico da Montefeltro." (Note: According to Giorgio Vasari, Piero worked for Guidobaldo da Montefeltro, who was Federico's son. However, in their Oxford World's Classics translation of Vasari, pp. 533-534, Julia Conaway Bondanella and Peter Bondanella write that Guidobaldo "was born too late to have been Piero's first patron, [and] Vasari probably means to allude to Guidantonio da Montefeltro," who was Federico's father. By contrast, Machtelt Brüggen Israëls writes in Piero della Francesca and the Invention of the Artist, p. 43, that Vasari was "possibly intending Federico di Montefeltro".) The Flagellation is generally considered Piero's oldest work in Urbino (c. 1455–1470). It is one of the most famous and controversial pictures of the early Renaissance. As discussed in its own entry, it is marked by an air of geometric sobriety, in addition to presenting a perplexing enigma as to the nature of the three men standing at the foreground.

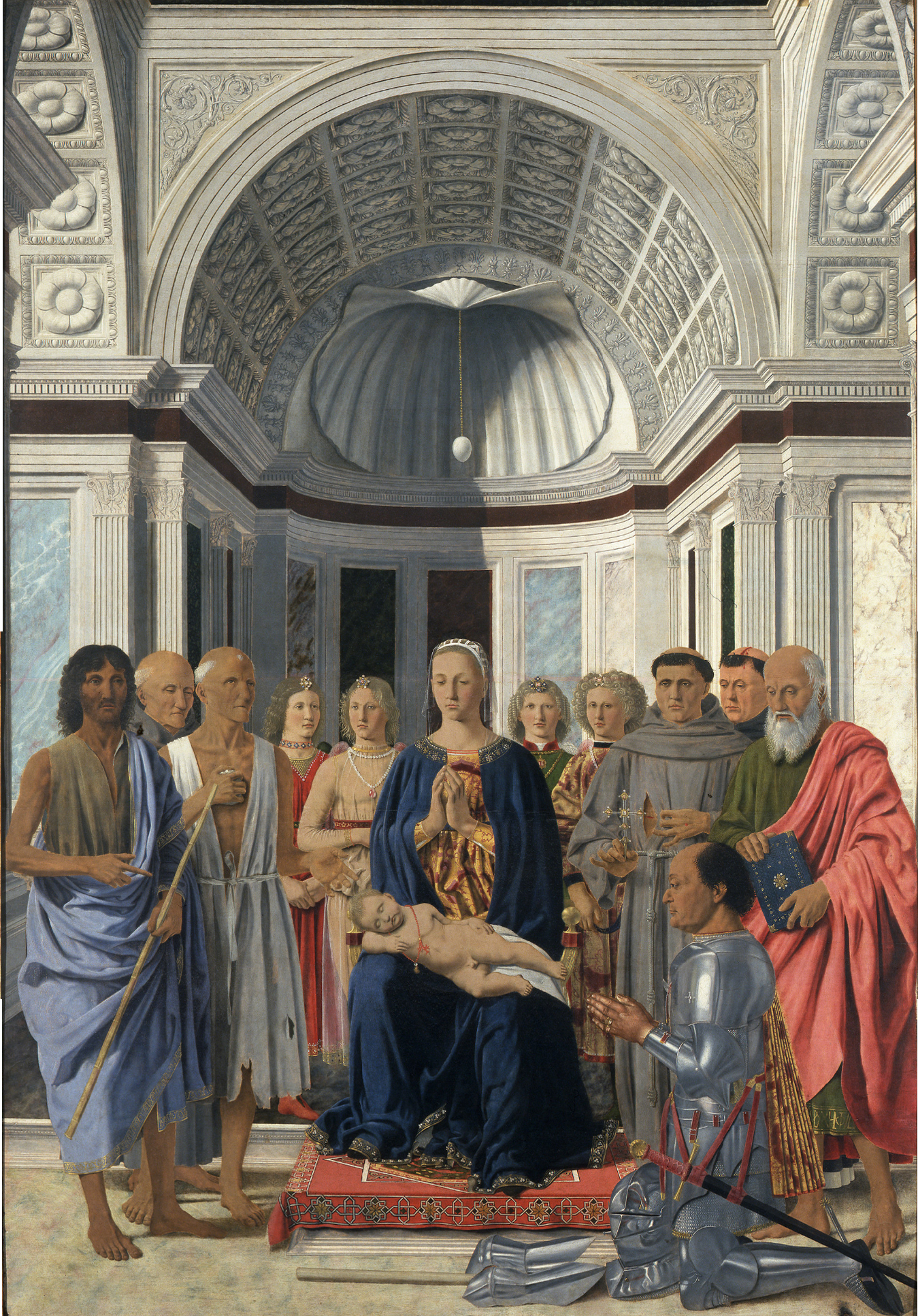
The Montefeltro Altarpiece or the Brera Madonna

Another famous work painted in Urbino is the Double Portrait of Federico and his wife Battista Sforza, in the Uffizi. The portraits in profile take their inspiration from large bronze medals and stucco roundels with the official portraits of Federico and his wife. Other paintings made in Urbino are the monumental Montefeltro Altarpiece (1474) in the Brera Gallery in Milan and the Madonna of Senigallia.

In Urbino Piero met the painters Melozzo da Forlì, Fra Carnevale, and the Flemish Justus van Gent, the mathematician Fra Luca Pacioli, the architect Francesco di Giorgio Martini, and probably also Leon Battista Alberti.

=== Later years ===
In his later years, painters such as Perugino and Luca Signorelli frequently visited his workshop. He completed the treatise On Perspective in Painting in the mid-1470s to 1480s. By 1480, his vision began to deteriorate, but he continued writing treatises such as Short Book on the Five Regular Solids in 1485. (Note: Although he may have given up painting in his later years, Vasari's remarks that he went blind at the age of 60 have to be doubted, since he completed his 1485 treatise on regular solids in his own handwriting. Machtelt Brüggen Israëls, however, wrote in 2020 that Piero was blind in his last months.) It is documented that Piero rented a house in Rimini in 1482. Piero made his will in 1487 and he died five years later, on 12 October 1492, in his own house in Sansepolcro. He left his possessions to his family and the Church.

== Criticism and interpretation ==
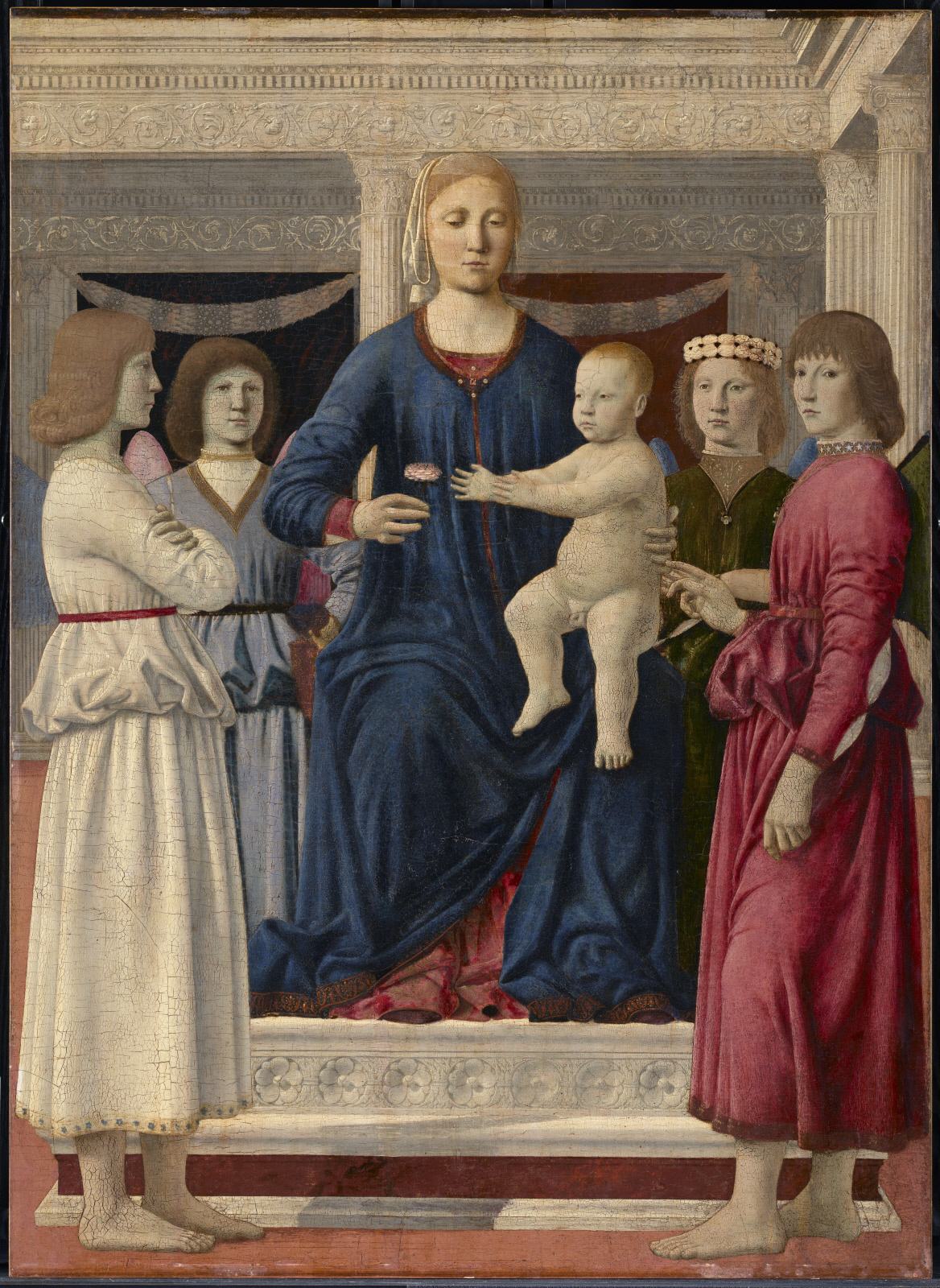
Virgin and Child Enthroned With Four Angels by Piero della Francesca, Clark Art Institute

In a 2013 exhibition, the Frick Collection in New York collected seven of the eight paintings of Piero known to exist in the United States. Of the seven paintings in the exhibit, critic Jerry Saltz writing in New York magazine singled out Piero's Virgin and Child Enthroned With Four Angels for its exemplary qualities.

Saltz wrote, "The Virgin and child are elevated two steps. They are in a world itself apart from this world apart. Mary isn't looking at her child and looks instead at the rose he reaches for. You begin to glean the revelation she is having. The flower represents love, devotion, and beauty. It also symbolizes blood and the crown of thorns Christ will wear. This child who will suffer a horrendous death reaches for his acceptance of fate. Mary does not pull the flower back. You sense an inner agony, noticing her deep-blue robe open to reveal scarlet beneath, symbol of outward passion and pain to come. In the dead-center vertical line of the painting is Christ's right palm that will be nailed to the cross."

By contrast, Walter Kaiser, reviewing the exhibition in The New York Review of Books, wrote, "The most splendid picture in the Frick exhibition is the magnificent figure of Saint Augustine from the Museu Nacional de Arte Antiga in Lisbon, a companion to Saint John the Evangelist [owned by the Frick Collection] on the Sant'Agostino altarpiece".

== Work in mathematics and geometry ==
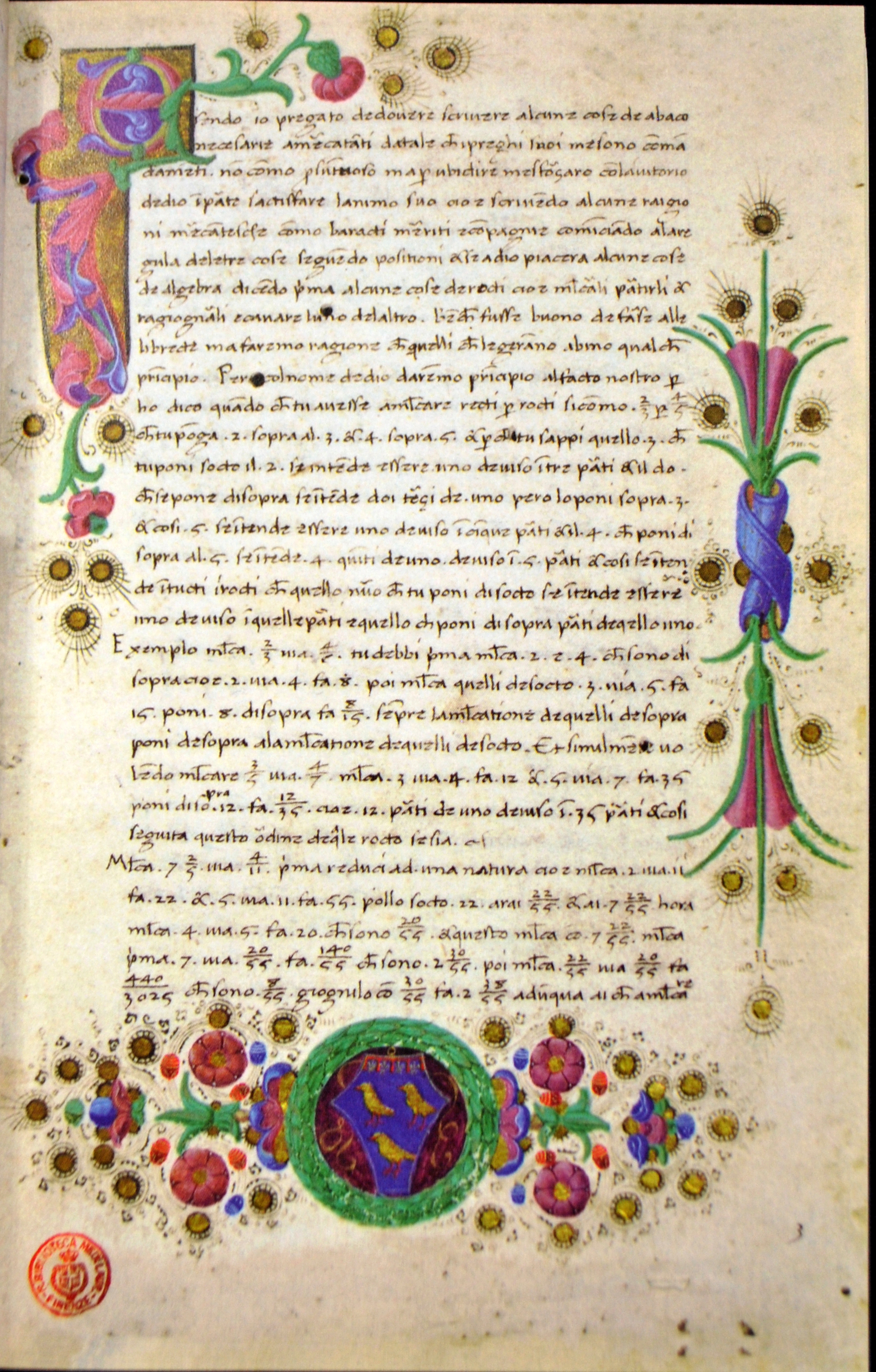
First page of the Trattato d'Abaco

Piero's deep interest in the theoretical study of perspective and his contemplative approach to his paintings are apparent in all his work. In his youth, Piero was trained in mathematics, which most likely was for mercantilism. Three treatises written by Piero have survived to the present day: Trattato d'Abaco (Abacus Treatise), De quinque corporibus regularibus (On the Five Regular Solids) (Note: Dedicated to Guidobaldo da Montefeltro, son and heir of Duke Federico.) and De Prospectiva pingendi (On Perspective in painting). The subjects covered in these writings include arithmetic, algebra, geometry and innovative work in both solid geometry and perspective. Much of Piero's work was later absorbed into the writing of others, notably Luca Pacioli. Piero's work on solid geometry was translated in Pacioli's Divina proportione, a work illustrated by Leonardo da Vinci. Biographers of his patron Federico da Montefeltro of Urbino record that he was encouraged to pursue the interest in perspective which was shared by the Duke.

In the late 1450s, Piero copied and illustrated the following works of Archimedes: On the Sphere and Cylinder, Measurement of a Circle, On Conoids and Spheroids, On Spirals, On the Equilibrium of Planes, The Quadrature of the Parabola, and The Sand Reckoner. The manuscript consists of 82 folio leaves, is held in the collection of the Biblioteca Riccardiana and is a copy of the translation of the Archimedean corpus made by Italian humanist Iacopo da San Cassiano.

== Influence ==
Bohuslav Martinů wrote a three movement work for orchestra entitled Les Fresques de Piero della Francesca. Dedicated to Rafael Kubelik, it was premiered by Kubelik and the Vienna Philharmonic at the 1956 Salzburg Festival.

Piero's geometrical perfection and the almost magic atmosphere of the light in his painting inspired modern painters like Giorgio de Chirico, Massimo Campigli, Felice Casorati, and Balthus.

== Selected works ==
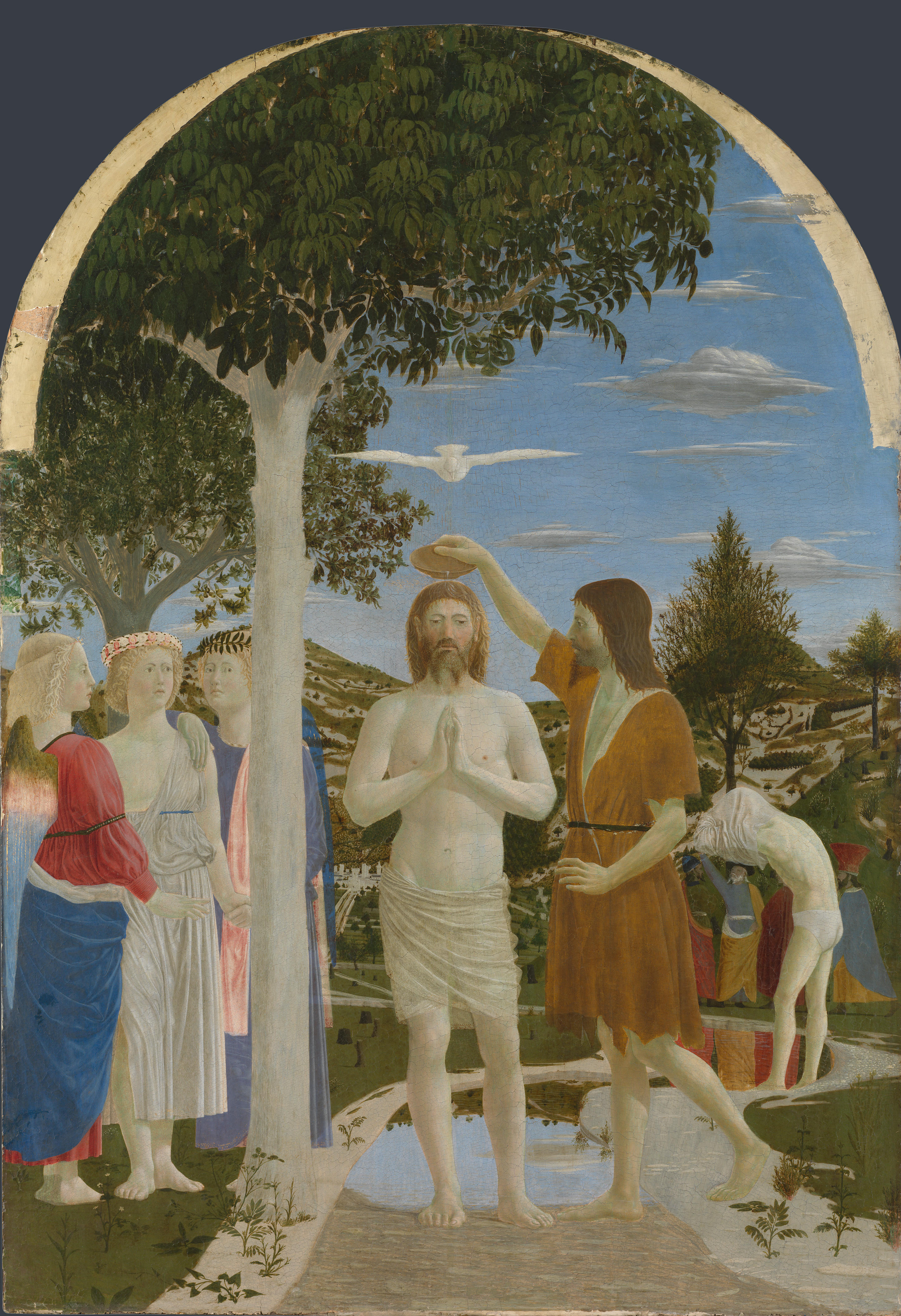
The Baptism of Christ, c. 1450, National Gallery, London

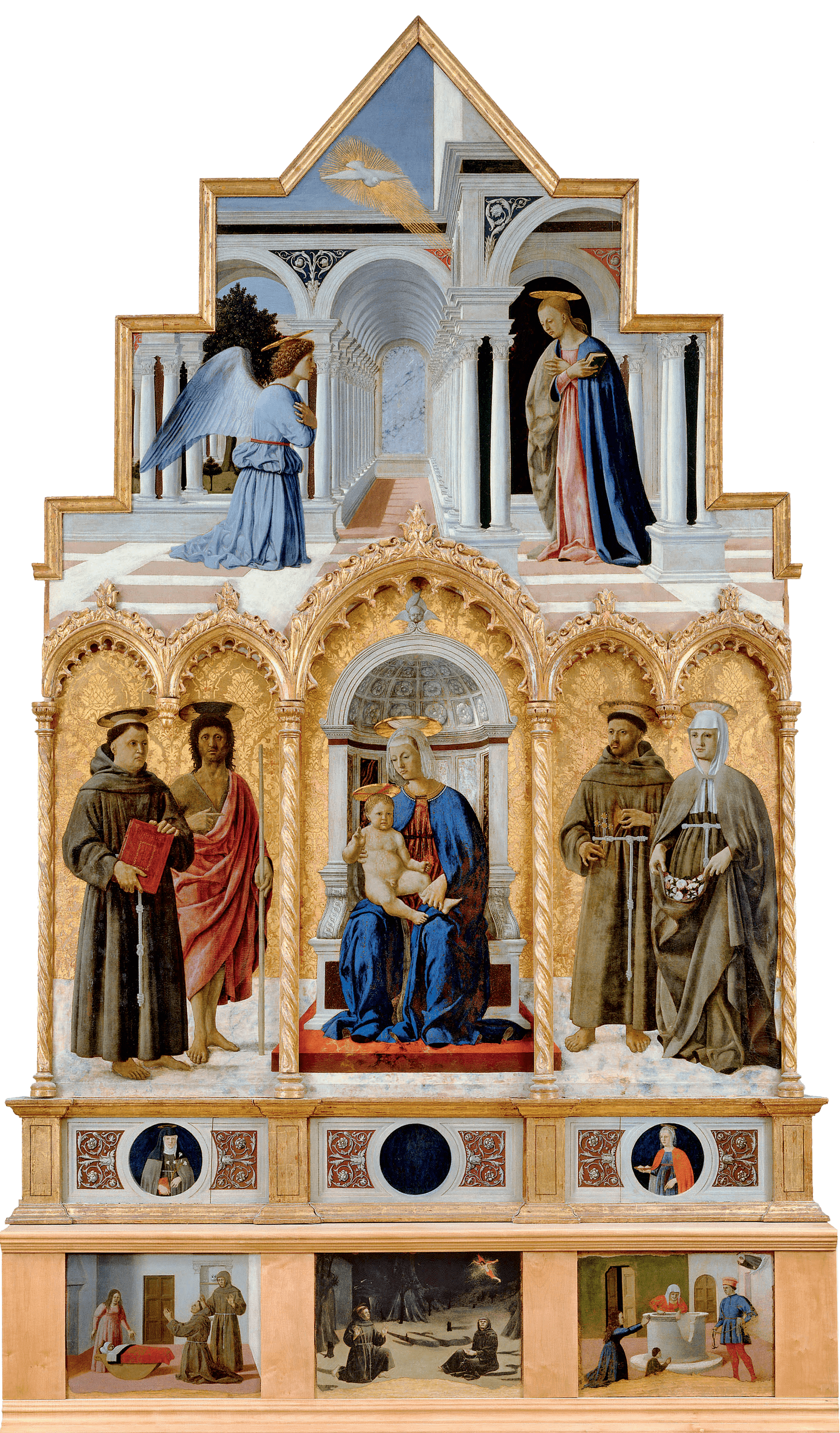
Polyptych of Perugia, c. 1470, Galleria Nazionale dell'Umbria, Perugia

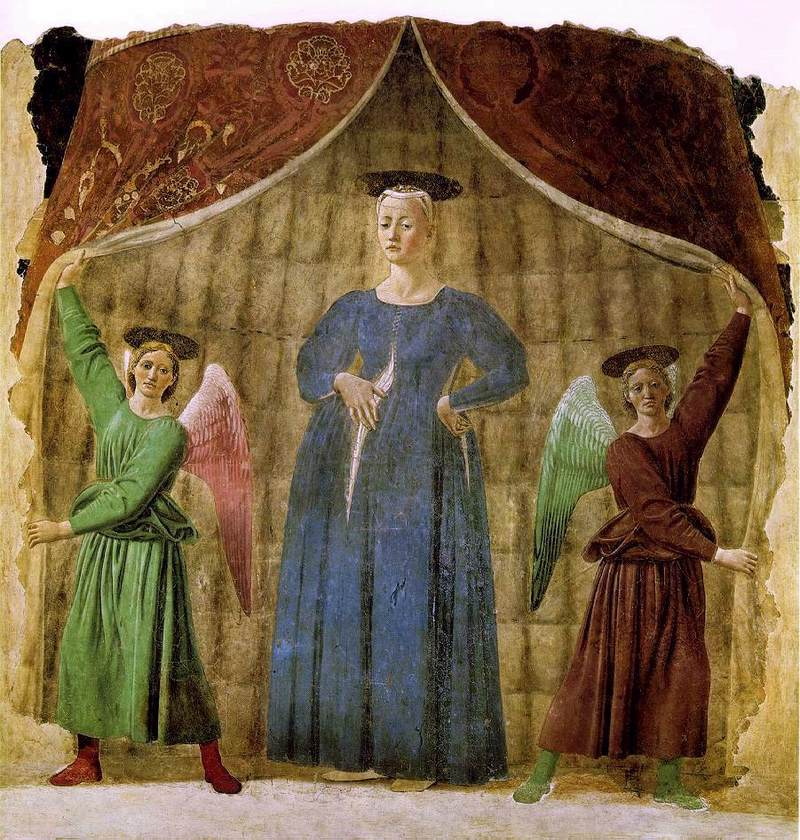
Madonna del Parto, in Monterchi, Sansepolcro, by Piero della Francesca

- Polyptych of the Misericordia (1445–62) – Tempera and oil on panel, 273 x 330 cm, Museo Civico Sansepolcro
- The Baptism of Christ (c. 1448–50) – Tempera on panel, 168 × 116 cm, National Gallery, London
- St. Jerome in Penitence (c. 1449–51) – Tempera on panel, 51 × 38 cm, Staatliche Museen, Berlin
- St. Jerome and a Donor (Girolamo Amadi) (1451) – Tempera and oil on panel, 49 × 42 cm, Gallerie dell'Accademia, Venice
- Sigismondo Pandolfo Malatesta Praying in Front of St. Sigismund (1451) – Fresco (transferred to canvas), 257 x 345 cm, Tempio Malatestiano, Rimini
- Portrait of Sigismondo Pandolfo Malatesta (c. 1451) – Tempera and oil on panel, 44.5 × 34.5 cm, Musée du Louvre, Paris
- The History of the True Cross (c. 1455–66) – Fresco cycle, Basilica of San Francesco, Arezzo
- The Flagellation of Christ (c. 1460) – Tempera on panel, 58.4 x 81.5 cm, Galleria Nazionale delle Marche, Urbino
- Polyptych of Saint Augustine (1460–70) – Tempera and oil on panels, dispersed in several museums
- Resurrection (c. 1463) – Fresco, 225 × 200 cm, Museo Civico Sansepolcro
- Hercules (c. 1465) – Fresco (detached), 151 × 126 cm, Isabella Stewart Gardner Museum, Boston
- St. Mary Magdalene (c. 1466, 1458–70s) – Fresco, 190 × 180 cm, Cathedral, Arezzo
- Madonna del Parto (1459–67) – Detached fresco, 260 × 203 cm, Chapel of the cemetery, Monterchi
- The Nativity (c. 1470) – Oil on panel, 124.5 × 123 cm, National Gallery, London
- Polyptych of Saint Anthony (c. 1470) – Oil on panel, 338 × 230 cm, Galleria Nazionale dell'Umbria, Perugia
- Brera Madonna, i.e. Montefeltro Altarpiece, (1472–74) – Oil on panel, 248 × 170 cm, Pinacoteca di Brera, Milan
- Diptych of the Count and Countess of Urbino, Federico da Montefeltro and Battista Sforza – Oil on panel, each 47,4 × 33,6 cm, Galleria degli Uffizi, Florence.
- Madonna di Senigallia (c. 1474) – Oil on panel, 67 × 53.5 cm, Galleria Nazionale delle Marche, Urbino
