= Portrait of Sigismondo Pandolfo Malatesta =

Painting attributed to Piero della Francesca

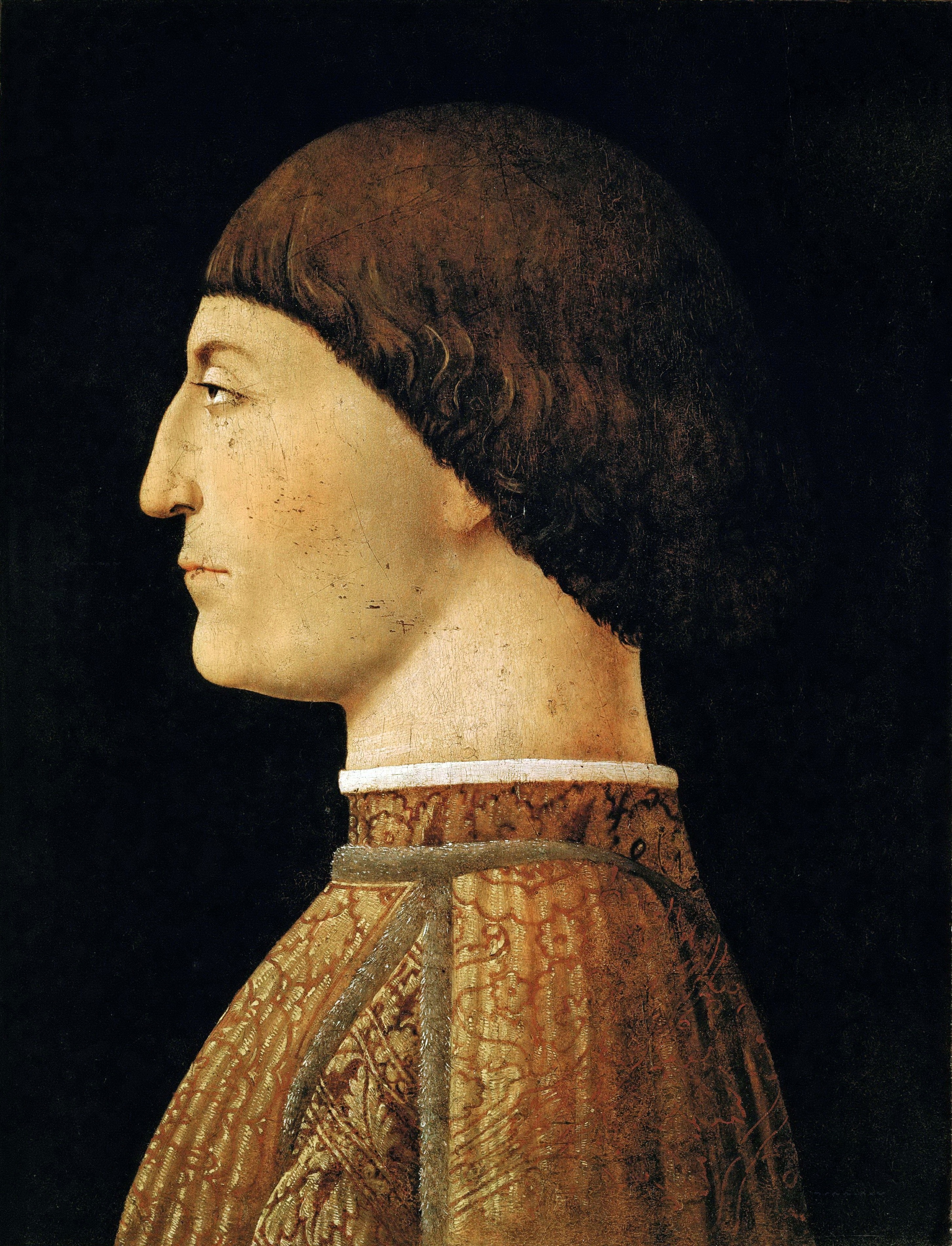
- Artist: Piero della Francesca, attributed
- Year: c. 1451
- Type: Oil and tempera on panel
- Dimensions: 44.5 cm × 34.5 cm (17.5 in × 13.6 in)
- Location: Louvre, Paris

The Portrait of Sigismondo Pandolfo Malatesta is a painting attributed to the Italian Renaissance master Piero della Francesca (c. 1451). It portrays the condottiero and lord of Rimini and Fano Sigismondo Pandolfo Malatesta, and is housed in the Musée du Louvre of Paris.

The portrait depicts the condottiero by profile and, according to some sources, was based on a medal executed in 1445 by Pisanello, or to one by Matteo de' Pasti from 1450. The picture itself is believed to be executed by Piero della Francesca during his sojourn in Rimini, during which he also painted the fresco with Sigismondo Pandolfo kneeling after St. Sigismund in the Tempio Malatestiano (Cathedral) of the city.

Despite the choice of the profile representation, typical of the portraits of eminent figures of the type, Piero della Francesca showed his attention for naturalist details in the fine execution of the texture and the hair of the committent. This is a proof of his good knowledge of Flemish masters such as Rogier van der Weyden.

Attribution is not certain and very late. Until 1889, it used to belong to the Russian Imperial Art Collection. Only as art piece of the d'Ancona collection in Milan in late 19th century, it was first attributed to Piero della Francesca by art-dealer Giovanni Morelli. From there it moved to Contini-Bonacossi collection, where Roberto Longhi reiterated the attribution before the family sold it to the Louvre. However, doubts were raised by Italian art critics and professors, some of whom believed it to be a neoclassical fake due to its uncanny resemblance with the painting of Tempio Malatestiano. Similarly, an Italian ministerial art commission refused to buy it in 1969 as part of the Contini-Bonacossi bequest due to the doubts surrounding its attribution. French art historians have, instead, always been unanimous on its attribution, especially after entering the Louvre collection.
