= De prospectiva pingendi =

Treatise by Piero della Francesca

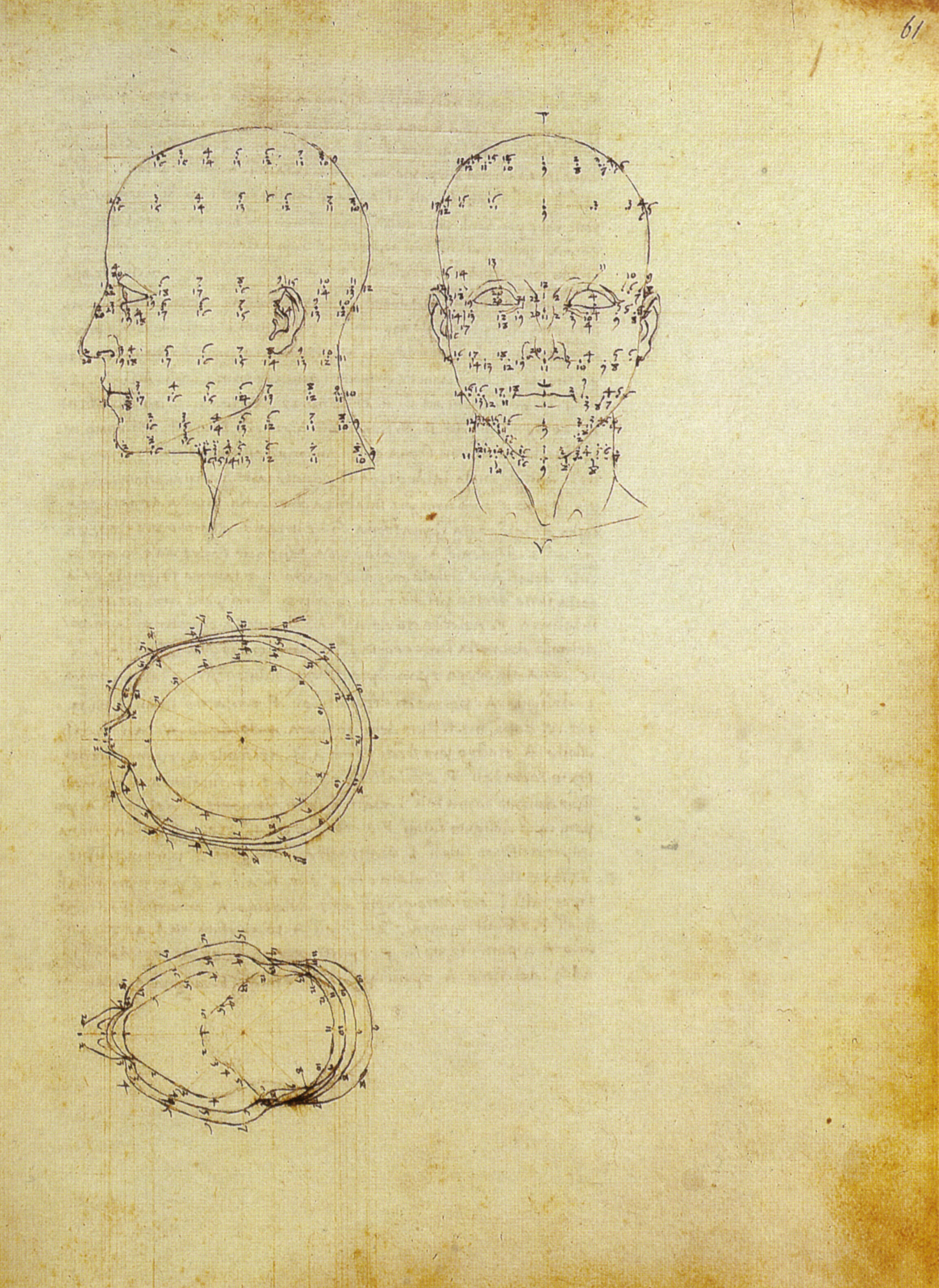
Perspective of anatomy from De prospectiva Pingendi.

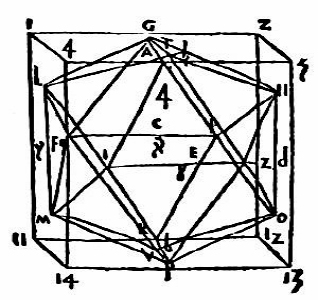
An icosahedron in perspective from De prospectiva pingendi

De prospectiva pingendi (On the Perspective of Painting) is the earliest and only pre-1500 Renaissance treatise solely devoted to the subject of perspective. It was written by the Italian master Piero della Francesca in the mid-1470s to 1480s, and possibly by about 1474. Despite its Latin title, the text is written in Italian.

== The book ==
The subjects covered by Piero della Francesca in these writings include arithmetic, algebra, geometry and innovative work in both solid geometry and perspective.

The script consists of three parts:

- Part One Disegno, describing techniques for painting faces
- Part Two Commensurazio, describing perspectives
- Part Three Coloro, describing techniques for creating perspectives by using colours

== History ==
De prospectiva pingendi was probably created in the years between 1474 until 1482.

The writings were inspired by the book De pictura by Leon Battista Alberti and references Euclid's Elements and Optics. The manuscript later came into the possession of the Biblioteca Palatina in Parma before it was transferred to the Biblioteca Ambrosiana.

Much of Piero's work was later absorbed into the writing of others, notably Luca Pacioli, whose Divina proportione (1509) discusses Piero's use of perspective, as well featuring an uncredited translation of Piero's entire work on solid geometry, De quinque corporibus regularibus.

In 1899 the work was first published in book form.
