= The Baptism of Christ (Piero della Francesca) =

Painting by Piero della Francesca (c. 1448–1450)

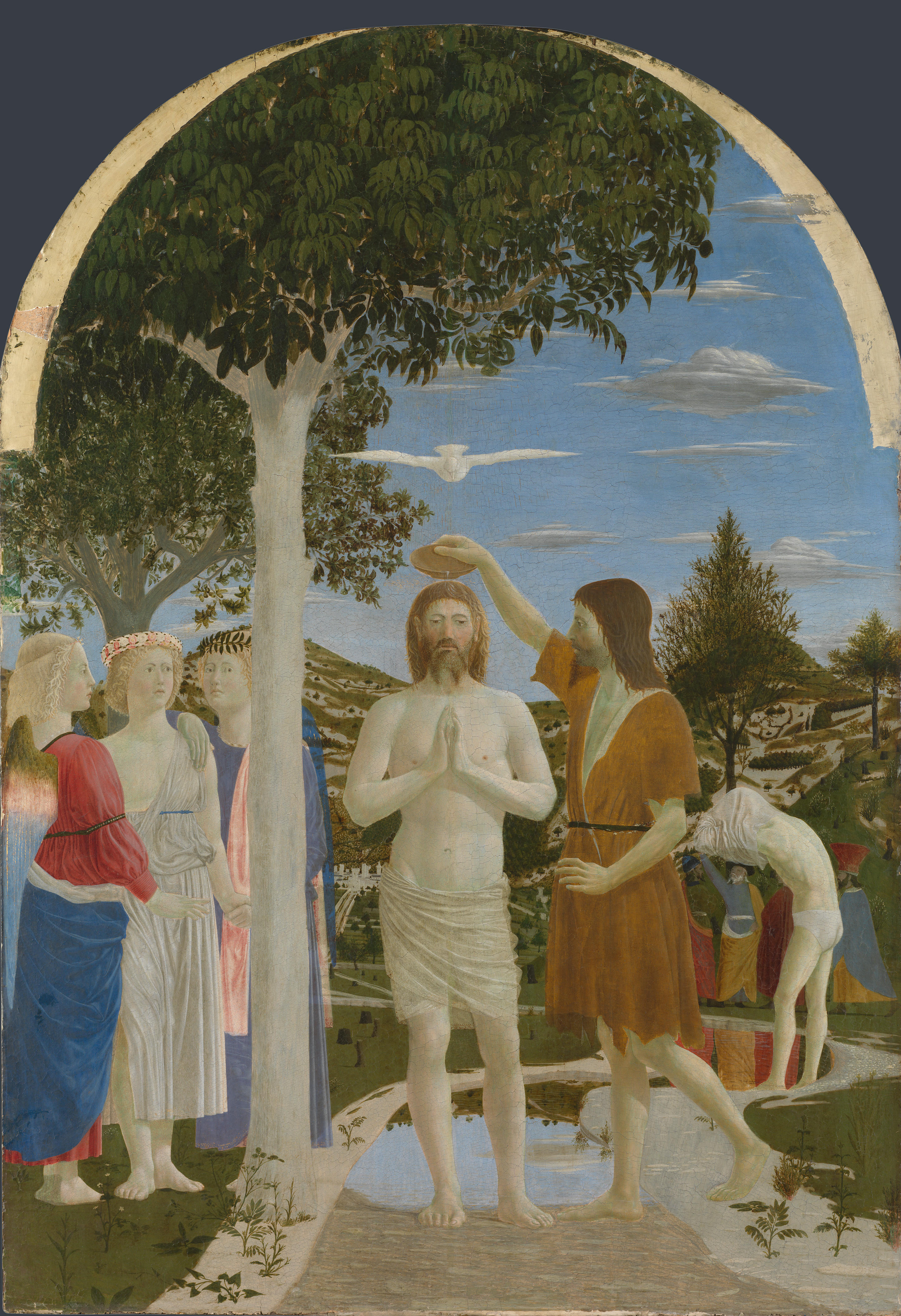
- Artist: Piero della Francesca
- Year: c. 1448–1450
- Medium: Tempera on panel
- Dimensions: 167 cm × 116 cm (66 in × 46 in)
- Location: National Gallery, London

The Baptism of Christ is a painting by the Italian Renaissance master Piero della Francesca. Painted in egg tempera on two panels of poplar wood, the dating is controversial – some give it a very early date, perhaps 1439; others much later, around 1460. It is held by the National Gallery, London.

The panel was commissioned presumably some time about 1440 by the Camaldolese Monastery of Sansepolcro in Tuscany, now Sansepolcro Cathedral. Sansepolcro was the town the birthplace of Piero della Francesca. The town depicted in the middle distance in the painting, to Christ's left, may be Sansepolcro. Its dating to Piero della Francesca's early career is evidenced by the strong relationship with the "light painting" of his master, Domenico Veneziano. It was originally part of a triptych, with side panels of St Peter and St Paul and a predella by Matteo di Giovanni dated to the early 1460s, now in the civic art gallery in Sansepolcro.

The composition is centred on the figure of Christ being baptised in the River Jordan by the figure of John the Baptist on the right. Behind John, a man in white briefs, his feet already in the water, is struggling to get out of his undershirt. Above Christ is a dove, representing the Holy Spirit, with the shape of its foreshortened wings resembling the clouds in the sky. The original triptych frame may have included a roundel above the dove showing God the Father, which with Christ and the dove representing the Holy Spirit would complete the Holy Trinity. The figure of Christ, John's hand and the bowl, and the bird, form an axis which divides the painting in two symmetrical parts.

A second division is created by the walnut tree on the left, with white bark that echoes the white skin of Christ, which divides the painting according to the golden ratio.

Balancing the figure of John to the right, but separated from Jesus by the tree's trunk, are three angels on the left who are wearing different clothing. In a break from traditional iconography, the angels are not supporting Christ's garments, but are holding each other's hands. This could be an allusion to the contemporary Council of Florence (1431–1445), whose goal was the unification of the Western and Eastern Churches. The Camaldolese monk and theologian, Saint Ambrose Traversari (+1439), who had been Prior General of the Camaladolese congregation, had been a strong supporter of the union. Such symbolism is also suggested by the presence, behind the neophyte on the right, of figures dressed in an oriental fashion, usually interpreted as Byzantine dignitaries. Alternatively, the three angels could also represent the three aspects of the Holy Trinity.

Piero della Francesca was renowned in his times as an authority on perspective and geometry: his attention to the theme is shown by John's arm and leg, which form two angles of the same size.

The monastery in Sansepolcro was dissolved in the 1860s, and the painting was bought by the National Gallery in London in 1861.
