= Polyptych of the Misericordia =

Altarpiece by Piero della Francesca

Madonna della Misericordia
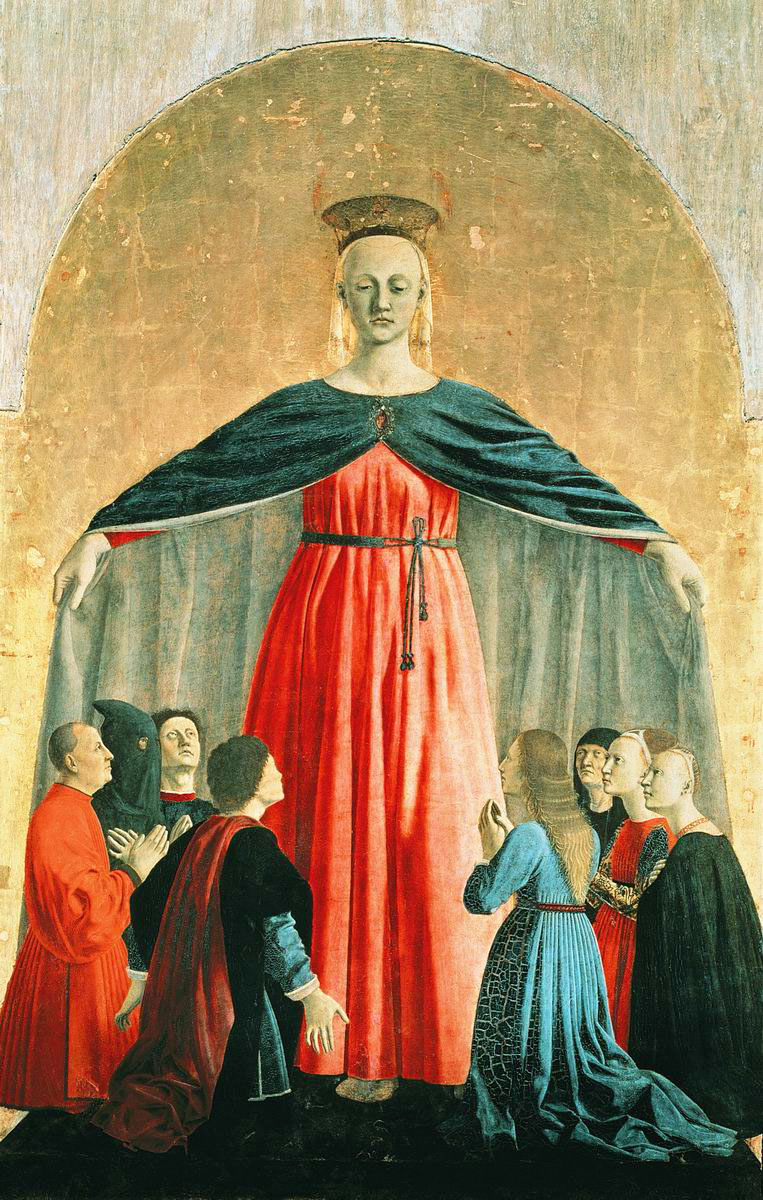
- Artist: Piero della Francesca
- Year: 1460–1462
- Type: Tempera and oil on panel
- Dimensions: 180 cm (71 in)
- Location: Pinacoteca Comunale; Sansepolcro

The Polyptych of the Misericordia is a painting conserved in the Museo Civico di Sansepolcro in the town of Sansepolcro, region of Tuscany, Italy. The painting is one of the earliest works of the Italian Renaissance painter Piero della Francesca, who was born in the town. The central panel is of the common motif of the Virgin of Mercy or Madonna della Misericordia.

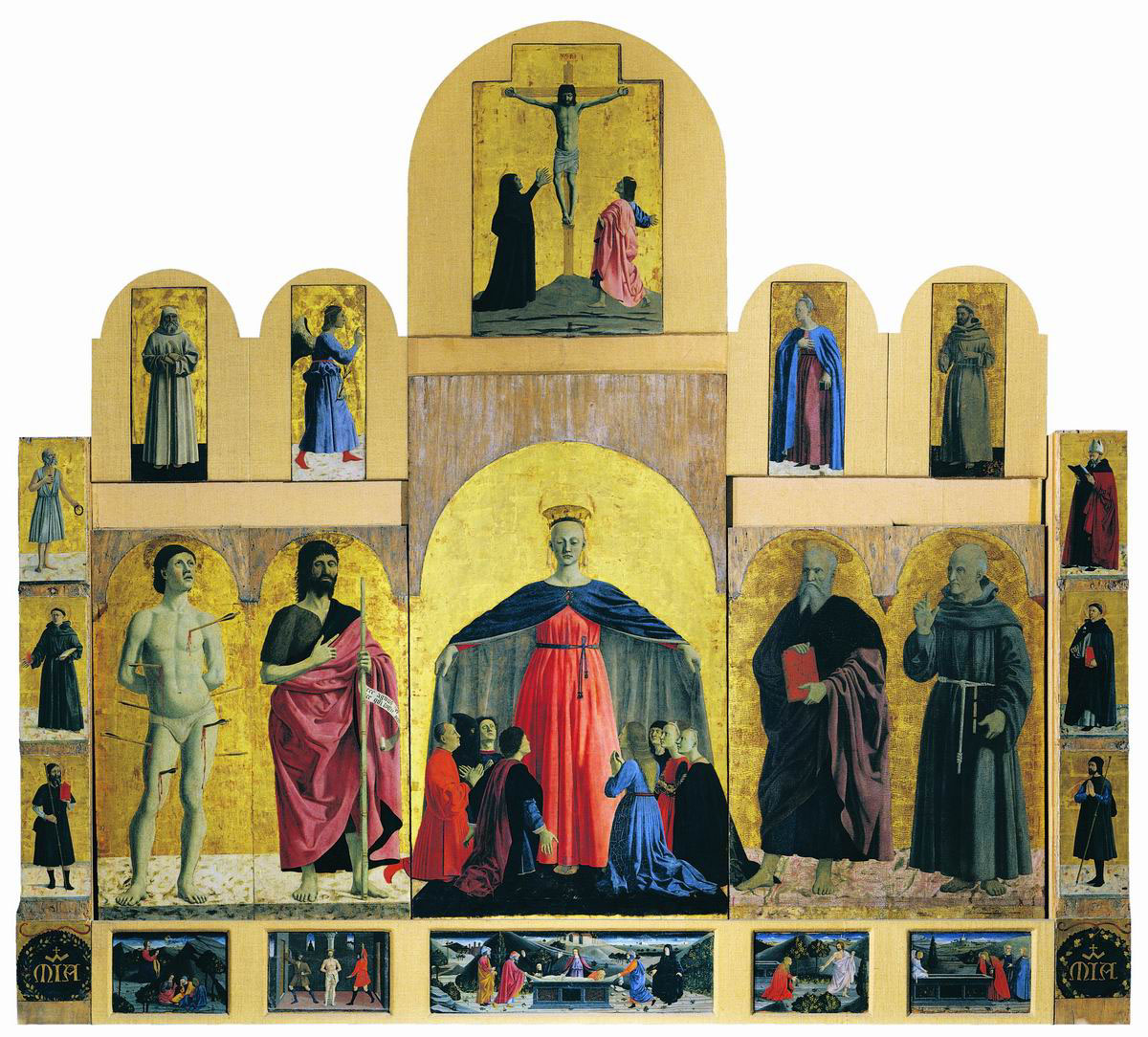
The larger setting

In 1445, the Compagnia della Misericordia, a confraternity of Borgo San Sepolcro, commissioned Piero, a native of the town, to paint a polyptych for them. According to the taste of the time, the polyptych was to be painted with precious colours and have a gilded background. Piero did not respect the three-year time limit set in the contract—he was busy working on many other projects. The polyptych was only finished seventeen years later, in 1462.

The oldest two panels, to the left of the main panel, depict St Sebastian and John the Baptist. St Sebastian's panel shows a close connection with Masaccio's nudes, which Piero would have seen in an early visit to Florence. Piero painted the outlying panels of the tympanum later; including the Crucifixion at the top centre, St Benedict, the Angel, the Madonna of the Annunciation, and St Francis in the sides. Towards 1450 he finished the figures of St. Andrew and St. Bernardino. The predellas, with five scenes of Jesus's life, were mostly executed by assistants.

The last part of the polyptych to be painted was the main central panel showing the Madonna della Misericordia. The panel portrays the mercifully protective gesture of the Madonna enfolding her followers in her mantle.

Piero resolves the difficulty of dealing with a flat solid gilded background, requested by the patrons, by placing the kneeling members of the confraternity (who commissioned the altarpiece) in the realistic three-dimensional space created by the Madonna's mantle, a space resembling the apse of a church. Notably, the Madonna is still portrayed larger in size than the human figures, a tradition in medieval painting. However, the fully three-dimensional rendering of the figure, inspired by Masaccio, and the perspective study, inspired by Brunelleschi, are plainly of the Renaissance.

== See also ==
- Consecration and entrustment to Mary
