= List of artworks in the Frick Collection =

This is an incomplete list of artworks in the Frick Collection in New York City, United States, which mainly holds European artworks from before the 20th century.

== Paintings ==
Artist	Span	Work	Date	Medium
Ivan Albright	1925-1983	works unknown, maybe a traveling exhibition	date unknown	oil on canvas
Andrea di Bartolo	active 1389–1428	Madonna and Child	date unknown	tempera on panel
Barna da Siena	active c. 1330–1350	Christ Bearing the Cross, with a Dominican Friar	c. 1350–1360	tempera on panel, cradled
Lazzaro Bastiani	active c. 1425–1512	Adoration of the Magi	1470–1479	tempera on poplar panel
Gentile Bellini	c. 1429–1507	Doge Giovanni Mocenigo	1478–1485	tempera on poplar panel
Giovanni Bellini	c. 1430–1516	St. Francis in the Desert	c. 1476–1478	tempera on poplar panel
Francesco Botticini	15th century	The Resurrection	1465–1470	tempera on poplar panel, cradled
François Boucher	1703–1770	A Lady on Her Day Bed	1743	oil on canvas
François Boucher	1703–1770	The Four Seasons: Spring	1755	oil on canvas
François Boucher	1703–1770	The Four Seasons: Summer	1755	oil on canvas
François Boucher	1703–1770	The Four Seasons: Autumn	1755	oil on canvas
François Boucher	1703–1770	The Four Seasons: Winter	1755	oil on canvas
François Boucher and workshop	1703–1770	The Arts and Sciences: Astronomy and Hydraulics	1750–1753	oil on canvas
François Boucher and workshop	1703–1770	The Arts and Sciences: Poetry and Music	1750–1753	oil on canvas
François Boucher and workshop	1703–1770	The Arts and Sciences: Fowling and Horticulture	1750–1753	oil on canvas
François Boucher and workshop	1703–1770	The Arts and Sciences: Fishing and Hunting	1750–1753	oil on canvas
François Boucher and workshop	1703–1770	The Arts and Sciences: Architecture and Chemistry	1750–1753	oil on canvas
François Boucher and workshop	1703–1770	The Arts and Sciences: Painting and Sculpture	1750–1753	oil on canvas
François Boucher and workshop	1703–1770	The Arts and Sciences: Comedy and Tragedy	1750–1753	oil on canvas
François Boucher and workshop	1703–1770	The Arts and Sciences: Singing and Dancing	1750–1753	oil on canvas
François Boucher, workshop of	1703–1770	Girl with Roses	1760s	oil on canvas
Agnolo Bronzino	1503–1572	Lodovico Capponi	1550–1555	oil on poplar panel
Pieter Bruegel the Elder	active 1551–1569	The Three Soldiers	1568	oil on oak panel
Willem Buytewech, attributed	c. 1591−1624	The Jovial Company	c. 1622–1624	oil on canvas
Eugène Carrière	1849–1906	Motherhood	1880s	oil on canvas
Jean-Baptiste-Siméon Chardin	1699−1779	Lady with a Bird-Organ	1753	oil on canvas
Jean-Baptiste-Siméon Chardin	1699−1779	Still Life with Plums	1728	oil on canvas
Cimabue	c. 1240 – c. 1302	The Flagellation of Christ	c. 1280	tempera on poplar panel
Claude Lorrain	1604–1682	The Sermon on the Mount	c. 1656	oil on canvas
John Constable	1776–1837	Salisbury Cathedral from the Bishop's Garden	1826	oil on canvas
John Constable	1776–1837	The White Horse	1819	oil on canvas
Jean-Baptiste-Camille Corot	1796–1875	The Arch of Constantine and the Forum, Rome	1843	oil on paper mounted on canvas
Jean-Baptiste-Camille Corot	1796–1875	The Boatman of Mortefontaine	c. 1865–1870	oil on canvas
Jean-Baptiste-Camille Corot	1796–1875	The Lake	1861	oil on canvas
Jean-Baptiste-Camille Corot	1796–1875	The Pond	c. 1868–1870	oil on canvas
Jean-Baptiste-Camille Corot	1796–1875	Ville-d'Avray	c. 1860	oil on canvas
Francis Cotes	1726–1770	Francis Vernon	1757	pastel on paper affixed to canvas
Francis Cotes	1726–1770	The Hon. Booth Grey	1764	oil on canvas
Aelbert Cuyp	1620–1691	Cows and Herdsman by a River	After 1650	oil on oak panel
Aelbert Cuyp	1620–1691	Dordrecht: Sunrise	c. 1650	oil on canvas
Aelbert Cuyp	1620–1691	River Scene	date unknown	oil on oak panel
Charles-François Daubigny	1817–1878	Dieppe	1877	oil on canvas
Charles-François Daubigny	1817–1878	The Washerwomen	1870–1874	oil on canvas
Gerard David	active 1484–1523	The Deposition	c. 1495–1500	oil on linen
Jacques-Louis David	1748−1825	Comtesse Daru	1810	oil on canvas
Césarine-Henriette-Flore Davin-Mirvault	1773–1844	Antonio Bartolomeo Bruni	c. 1804	oil on canvas
Edgar Degas	1834–1917	The Rehearsal	1878–1879	oil on canvas
François-Hubert Drouais	1727–1775	The Comte and Chevalier de Choiseul as Savoyards	1758	oil on canvas
Duccio di Buoninsegna	c. 1255 – c. 1319	The Temptation of Christ on the Mountain	1308–1311	tempera on poplar panel
Jules Dupré	1811–1889	The River	date unknown	oil on canvas
James Whitney Fosburgh	1910–1978	View of Montauk	date unknown	oil on canvas
Jean-Honoré Fragonard	1732–1806	The Progress of Love: The Pursuit	1771–1772	oil on canvas
Jean-Honoré Fragonard	1732–1806	The Progress of Love: The Meeting	1771–1772	oil on canvas
Jean-Honoré Fragonard	1732–1806	The Progress of Love: The Lover Crowned	1771–1772	oil on canvas
Jean-Honoré Fragonard	1732–1806	The Progress of Love: Love Letters	1771–1772	oil on canvas
Jean-Honoré Fragonard	1732–1806	The Progress of Love: Reverie	1790–1791	oil on canvas
Jean-Honoré Fragonard	1732–1806	The Progress of Love: Love Triumphant	1790–1791	oil on canvas
Jean-Honoré Fragonard	1732–1806	The Progress of Love: Love the Avenger	1790–1791	oil on canvas
Jean-Honoré Fragonard	1732–1806	The Progress of Love: Love Pursuing a Dove	1790–1791	oil on canvas
Jean-Honoré Fragonard	1732–1806	The Progress of Love: Love the Jester	1790–1791	oil on canvas
Jean-Honoré Fragonard	1732–1806	The Progress of Love: Love the Sentinel	1790–1791	oil on canvas
Jean-Honoré Fragonard	1732–1806	The Progress of Love: Hollyhocks (4 panels)	1790–1791	oil on canvas
French, Probably Burgundian	14th century	Virgin and Child	c. 1390–1400	oil and tempera on panel
French, Probably South of France	15th century	Pietà with Donor	15th century	tempera or mixed technique on panel
Thomas Gainsborough	1727–1788	Grace Dalrymple Elliott	c. 1782	oil on canvas
Thomas Gainsborough, attributed	1727–1788	Mrs. Charles Hatchett	c. 1786	oil on canvas
Thomas Gainsborough	1727–1788	Mrs. Peter William Baker	1781	oil on canvas
Thomas Gainsborough	1727–1788	Richard Paul Jodrell	c. 1774	oil on canvas
Thomas Gainsborough	1727–1788	Sarah, Lady Innes	c. 1757	oil on canvas
Thomas Gainsborough	1727–1788	The Hon. Frances Duncombe	c. 1777	oil on canvas
Thomas Gainsborough	1727–1788	The Mall in St. James's Park	c. 1783	oil on canvas
Gentile da Fabriano	c. 1385 – before 1427	Madonna and Child, with Saints Lawrence and Julian	1423–1425	tempera on panel, cradled
Baron François Gérard	1770–1837	Portrait of Camillo Borghese	c. 1810	oil on canvas
Francisco de Goya	1746–1828	An Officer (Conde de Teba?)	c. 1804 (?)	oil on canvas
Francisco de Goya	1746–1828	Don Pedro, Duque de Osuna	c. 1790s	oil on canvas
Francisco de Goya	1746–1828	Portrait of a Lady (María Martínez de Puga?)	1824	oil on canvas
Francisco de Goya	1746–1828	The Forge	c. 1815–1820	oil on canvas
El Greco	1541–1614	Purification of the Temple	c. 1600	oil on canvas
El Greco	1541–1614	St. Jerome	1590–1600	oil on canvas
El Greco	1541–1614	Vincenzo Anastagi	1571–1576	oil on canvas
Jean-Baptiste Greuze	1725−1805	Madame Baptiste Aîné	c. 1799	pastel on cream paper
Jean-Baptiste Greuze	1725−1805	Baptiste Aîné	c. 1799	pastel on cream paper
Jean-Baptiste Greuze	1725−1805	The Wool Winder	c. 1759	oil on canvas
Francesco Guardi	1712–1793	Regatta in Venice	c. 1770	oil on canvas
Francesco Guardi	1712–1793	View of the Cannaregio Canal in Venice	c. 1770	oil on canvas
Frans Hals	1581/1585–1666	Portrait of a Man	c. 1660	oil on canvas
Frans Hals	1581/1585–1666	Portrait of a Painter	early 1650s	oil on canvas
Frans Hals	1581/1585–1666	Portrait of a Woman	1635	oil on canvas
Frans Hals	1581/1585–1666	Portrait of an Elderly Man	1627–1630	oil on canvas
Meyndert Hobbema	1638–1709	Village among Trees	1665	oil on oak panel
Meyndert Hobbema	1638–1709	Village with Water Mill among Trees	c. 1665	oil on canvas
William Hogarth	1697–1764	Miss Mary Edwards	1742	oil on canvas
Hans Holbein the Younger	1497/1498–1543	Sir Thomas More	1527	oil on oak panel
Hans Holbein the Younger	1497/1498–1543	Thomas Cromwell	1532–1533	oil on oak panel
John Hoppner	1758–1810	The Hon. Lucy Byng	c. 1790	oil on canvas
John Hoppner	1758–1810	The Ladies Sarah and Catherine Bligh	c. 1790	oil on canvas
Jean-Auguste-Dominique Ingres	1780–1867	Comtesse d'Haussonville	1845	oil on canvas
John C. Johansen	1876–1964	Henry Clay Frick	1943	oil on canvas
Gerald Kelly	1879–1972	Portrait of Henry Clay Frick	1924	oil on canvas
Jacques de Lajoue, attributed	1687–1761	Seven Decorative Panels	c. 1730–1740	oil on canvas
Georges de La Tour, studio of	1593–1652	The Education of the Virgin	c. 1650	oil on canvas
Thomas Lawrence	1769–1830	Portrait of Julia, Lady Peel	1827	oil on canvas
Thomas Lawrence	1769–1830	Miss Louisa Murray	after 1827	oil on canvas
Jean-Étienne Liotard	1702–1789	Trompe l'Oeil	1771	oil on silk transferred to canvas
Fra Filippo Lippi	c. 1406–1469	The Annunciation	c. 1440	tempera on poplar panels
Nicholas Lochoff	1872–1948	Madonna and Child with Saint Francis and Saint John	1928–1930	
Édouard Manet	1832–1883	The Bullfight	1864	oil on canvas
Jacobus Hendrikus Maris	1837–1899	The Bridge	1885	oil on canvas
Anton Mauve	1838–1888	Early Morning Ploughing	c. 1875	oil on canvas
Hans Memling	c. 1430–1494	Portrait of a Man	c. 1470–1475	oil on oak panel
Gabriel Metsu	1629–1667	A Lady at Her Toilet	c. 1660	oil on canvas
Jean-François Millet	1814–1875	Woman Sewing by Lamplight	1870–1872	oil on canvas
Claude-Oscar Monet	1840–1926	Vétheuil in Winter	1878–1879	oil on canvas
Giovanni Battista Moroni	c. 1520/1524–1579/1580	Portrait of a Woman	c. 1575	oil on canvas
Bartolomé Esteban Murillo	1617–1682	Self-Portrait	c. 1650–1655	oil on canvas
Jean-Marc Nattier	1685–1766	Elizabeth, Countess of Warwick	1754	oil on canvas
William Orpen	1878–1931	Portrait of Andrew W. Mellon	1924	oil on canvas
Isack van Ostade	1621–1649	Travelers Halting at an Inn	date unknown	oil on oak panel
Jean-Baptiste Pater	1695–1736	Procession of Italian Comedians	date unknown	oil on canvas
Jean-Baptiste Pater	1695–1736	The Village Orchestra	date unknown	oil on canvas
Piero della Francesca	c. 1415–1492	Augustinian Friar	date unknown	tempera on poplar panel
Piero della Francesca	c. 1415–1492	Augustinian Nun	date unknown	tempera on poplar panel
Piero della Francesca	c. 1415–1492	St. John the Evangelist	c. 1454–1469	tempera on poplar panel
Piero della Francesca	c. 1415–1492	The Crucifixion	date unknown	tempera on poplar panel
Carel van der Pluym	1625–1672	Old Woman with a Book	date unknown	oil on canvas
Henry Raeburn	1756–1823	Alexander Allan	c. 1815	oil on canvas
Henry Raeburn	1756–1823	James Cruikshank	1805–1808	oil on canvas
Henry Raeburn	1756–1823	Mrs. James Cruikshank	1805–1808	oil on canvas
Rembrandt van Rijn	1606–1669	Nicolaes Ruts	1631	oil on mahogany panel
Rembrandt van Rijn	1606–1669	Self-Portrait	1658	oil on canvas
Rembrandt van Rijn	1606–1669	The Polish Rider	c. 1655	oil on canvas
Rembrandt van Rijn, follower of	1606–1669	Portrait of a Young Artist	date unknown	oil on canvas
Pierre-Auguste Renoir	1841–1919	La Promenade	1875–1876	oil on canvas
Joshua Reynolds	1723–1792	Elizabeth, Lady Taylor	c. 1780	oil on canvas
Joshua Reynolds	1723–1792	General John Burgoyne	c. 1766	oil on canvas
Joshua Reynolds	1723–1792	Lady Cecil Rice	1762	oil on canvas
Joshua Reynolds	1723–1792	Selina, Lady Skipwith	1787	oil on canvas
George Romney	1734–1802	Charlotte, Lady Milnes	1788–1792	oil on canvas
George Romney	1734–1802	Henrietta, Countess of Warwick, and Her Children	1787–1789	oil on canvas
George Romney	1734–1802	Lady Hamilton as 'Nature'	1782	oil on canvas
George Romney	1734–1802	Miss Frances Mary Harford	1780–1783	oil on canvas
George Romney	1734–1802	Miss Mary Finch-Hatton	1788	oil on canvas
Théodore Rousseau	1812–1867	The Village of Becquigny	c. 1857	oil on mahogany panel
Peter Paul Rubens, follower of	1577–1640	A Knight of the Order of the Golden Fleece	date unknown	oil on canvas
Jacob van Ruisdael	c. 1629–1682	Landscape with a Footbridge	1652	oil on canvas
Jacob van Ruisdael	c. 1629–1682	Quay at Amsterdam	c. 1670	oil on canvas
Salomon van Ruysdael	c. 1602–1670	Landscape with Farmhouse	1628	oil on panel
Salomon van Ruysdael	c. 1602–1670	River Scene: Men Dragging a Net	c. 1667	oil on canvas
Gabriel de Saint-Aubin	1724–1780	The Private Academy	c. 1755	oil on panel
Gerard van Spaendonck	1746–1822	Grapes with Insects on a Marble Top	1791–1795	oil on marble
Gilbert Stuart	1755–1828	George Washington	1795–1796	oil on canvas
Gerard ter Borch	1617–1681	Portrait of a Young Lady	c. 1665–1670	oil on canvas
Frits Thaulow	1847−1906	Winter in Norway	c. 1895	oil on canvas
Giovanni Battista Tiepolo	1696–1770	Perseus and Andromeda	c. 1730–1731	oil on paper affixed to canvas
Jacopo Tintoretto, circle of	1518–1594	Portrait of a Venetian Procurator	date unknown	oil on canvas
Titian	c. 1488–1576	Pietro Aretino	c. 1537	oil on canvas
Titian	c. 1488–1576	Portrait of a Man in a Red Cap	c. 1510	oil on canvas
Constant Troyon	1810–1865	A Pasture in Normandy	1850s	oil on panel
Joseph Mallord William Turner	1775–1851	Antwerp: Van Goyen Looking Out for a Subject	1833	oil on canvas
Joseph Mallord William Turner	1775–1851	Cologne, the Arrival of a Packet-Boat: Evening	1826	oil on canvas
Joseph Mallord William Turner	1775–1851	Fishing Boats Entering Calais Harbor	c. 1803	oil on canvas
Joseph Mallord William Turner	1775–1851	Mortlake Terrace: Early Summer Morning	1826	oil on canvas
Joseph Mallord William Turner	1775–1851	The Harbor of Dieppe: Changement de Domicile	1825–1826	oil on canvas
Jan van de Cappelle, follower of	c. 1624 – c. 1679	A View of the River Maas before Rotterdam	c. 1645–1665	oil on oak panel, cradled
Hendrick van der Burgh, attributed	active 1649 – after 1669	Drinkers before the Fireplace	c. 1660	oil on canvas
Anthony van Dyck	1599–1641	Frans Snyders	c. 1620	oil on canvas
Anthony van Dyck	1599–1641	Genoese Noblewoman	1625–1627	oil on canvas
Anthony van Dyck	1599–1641	James Stanley, Lord Strange, Later Seventh Earl of Derby, with His Wife, Charlotte, and Their Daughter	c. 1636	oil on canvas
Anthony van Dyck	1599–1641	Lady Anne Carey, Later Viscountess Claneboye and Countess of Clanbrassil	c. 1636	oil on canvas
Anthony van Dyck	1599–1641	Marchesa Giovanna Cattaneo	1622–1627	oil on canvas
Anthony van Dyck	1599–1641	Margareta de Vos	c. 1620	oil on canvas
Anthony van Dyck	1599–1641	Ottaviano Canevari	1627	oil on canvas
Anthony van Dyck	1599–1641	Sir John Suckling	c. 1638	oil on canvas
Jan van Eyck and workshop	active 1422–1441	Virgin and Child, with Saints and Donor	c. 1441–1443	oil on panel
Diego Velázquez	1599–1660	King Philip IV of Spain	1644	oil on canvas
Paolo Veneziano and his son Giovanni Veneziano	active 1321–1358	The Coronation of the Virgin	1358	tempera on poplar panel
Johannes Vermeer	1632–1675	Girl Interrupted at Her Music	c. 1658–1659	oil on canvas
Johannes Vermeer	1632–1675	Mistress and Maid	1666−1667	oil on canvas
Johannes Vermeer	1632–1675	Officer and Laughing Girl	c. 1657	oil on canvas
Paolo Veronese	1528–1588	The Choice Between Virtue and Vice	c. 1565	oil on canvas
Paolo Veronese	1528–1588	Wisdom and Strength	c. 1565	oil on canvas
Jean-Antoine Watteau	1684–1721	The Portal of Valenciennes	c. 1710–1711	oil on canvas
James McNeill Whistler	1834–1903	Arrangement in Black and Gold: Comte Robert de Montesquiou-Fezensac	1891–1892	oil on canvas
James McNeill Whistler	1834–1903	Arrangement in Brown and Black: Portrait of Miss Rosa Corder	1876–1878	oil on canvas
James McNeill Whistler	1834–1903	Harmony in Pink and Gray: Portrait of Lady Meux	1881–1882	oil on canvas
James McNeill Whistler	1834–1903	Symphony in Flesh Colour and Pink: Portrait of Mrs. Frances Leyland	1871–1874	oil on canvas
James McNeill Whistler	1834–1903	The Ocean	1866	oil on canvas
Konrad Witz, circle of	c. 1400 – c. 1447	Pietà	c. 1440	tempera and oil on panel
Philips Wouwerman	1619–1668	The Cavalry Camp	date unknown	oil on oak panel

== Sculpture ==
Artist	Span	Work	Date	Medium
Jean-Louis Lemoyne	1665–1755	Garden Vase	1727–1728	marble
Étienne-Maurice Falconet	1716–1791	Fidelity Crowning Love	c. 1760	marble
John Lochee	1751 – c. 1791	Bust of a Lady, Perhaps Mrs. Mary Robinson	1775–1790	marble
Francesco Laurana	c. 1430 – c. 1502	Bust of a Lady	c. 1430–1502	marble
Jean-Antoine Houdon	active 1741–1828	The Comtesse du Cayla	1777	marble
French	19th century	Louis XIV (?)	19th century	marble
French	18th century	Friendship	c. 1770	marble
Jean-Antoine Houdon	active 1741–1828	Armand-Thomas Hue, Marquis de Miromesnil	1777	marble
Malvina Hoffman	1887–1966 Primary	Bust of Henry Clay Frick	1922	white marble
Francesco Laurana	c. 1430 – c. 1502	Beatrice of Aragon	1471–1474	white marble
Northern Italian	early 16th century	She-Wolf	early 16th century	bronze
Riccio, known as Andrea Briosco, workshop of	1470–1532	Warrior on Horseback	early 16th century	bronze
Roman	late 16th century	Virtue Overcoming Vice	1550–1600	bronze
Northern Italian	early 16th century	Horse	early 16th century	bronze
Riccio, known as Andrea Briosco, workshop of	1470–1532	Goat	16th century	bronze
Venetian	late 18th or early 19th century	Firedog with a Figure of Venus	1775–1825	bronze
Venetian	late 18th or early 19th century	Firedog with a Figure of Jupiter	1775–1825	bronze
Northern Italian	16th century	Naked Youth with Raised Arms	16th century	bronze
Italian	16th century	She-Wolf	1st half 16th century	bronze
Bertoldo di Giovanni	1420/1430–1491	Heraldic Wild Man	15th century	bronze with extensive traces of gilding on base
Caspar Gras	c. 1590–1674	Infant Faun	early 17th century	bronze
Nuremberg	16th century	Satyr Mother and Child	last quarter 16th century	bronze
Hubert Gerhard, attributed	c. 1550–1622/23	Triton and Nereid	c. 1620	bronze
Hans Multscher, attributed	c. 1400–1467	Reliquary Bust of a Female Saint	c. 1460	bronze
Italian	19th century	Reclining Antelope (?)	19th century	bronze
François Girardon	1628–1715	The Grand Dauphin	18th century	bronze
French	probably 18th century	Head of a Girl	18th century(?)	bronze
French	probably 18th century	Head of a Boy	18th century(?)	bronze
French	17th century	Hercules and the Hydra	mid 17th century	bronze
Jean Barbet	active 1475 – d.1514	Angel	1475	bronze
Antoine Coysevox	1640–1720	Henri de la Tour d'Auvergne, Maréchal Turenne	early 18th century	bronze
Antoine Coysevox	1640–1720	Robert de Cotte	early 18th century	bronze
François Girardon	1628–1715	Marie-Thérèse, Queen of France	18th century	bronze
Netherlandish	17th century	Venus	17th century	bronze
Jacques Jonghelinck	1530–1606	The Duke of Alba	1571	bronze
Frederic Remington	1861–1909	The Bronco Buster	1919	bronze
Carl Augustus Heber	1875–1956	Medal	1st half 20th century	bronze
Katherine Ward Lane Weems	1899–1989	Whippet	1925	bronze
Louis-Simon Boizot	1743–1809	Peter Adolf Hall	1775	terracotta
Augustin Pajou	1730–1809	Marie-Adelaide Hall	1775	terracotta
Claude Michel Clodion	1738–1814	Zephyrus and Flora	1799	terracotta
Claude Michel Clodion	1738–1814	Satyr with Two Bacchantes	1799	terracotta
French	18th century (?)	Bust of a Young Girl	18th century ?	terracotta
Jean-Antoine Houdon	active 1741–1828	Diana the Huntress	1776–1795	terracotta
Gian Lorenzo Bernini	1598–1680	Head of an Angel	17th century	terracotta
Joseph Chinard	1756–1813	Portrait of Etienne-Vincent Marniola	1809	terracotta
