= Jérôme-François Chantereau =

French painter

Jérôme-François Chantereau, a French painter, engraver, and art dealer who was born in Paris about 1710. Chantereau was a member of the Académie de Saint-Luc, and in his youth became a court painter to the King of Denmark.

His works were chiefly battle-pieces and hunting-scenes, painted with considerable life and movement. They recall Jean-Antoine Watteau's. In fact, it is probable that he studied under Watteau or Pater. A scarce etching of his exists, entitled, Divertissement par eau et par mer, or, as it is sometimes called, L'lle de Cythère. Chantereau was also an art dealer.

During a dinner in Paris on April 16, 1741, Chantereau had an altercation with his friend (or possibly his rival), fellow art dealer and art restorer Joseph Ferdinand Godefroid over the attribution of a 17th-century painting to Carlo Maratta. The two wound up fighting with swords in a duel just outside the gates of the Louvre. Godefroid was pierced in the ribs and died on the spot, on the Cour Carrée, or in a nearby church. Chantereau was acquitted, as it was impossible to determine who started the fight.

He died in 1757.
