= Portrait of a Man in a Red Hat =

Painting by Hans Memling

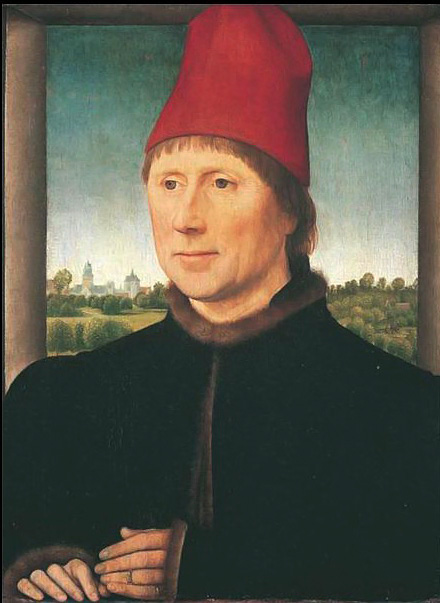
Portrait of a Man in a Red Hat (1465–1470) by Hans Memling

Portrait of a Man in a Red Hat is a 1465–1470 oil on oak panel painting by Hans Memling, one of the first portraits he produced in Bruges, with similarities to his Portrait of a Man - its subject is unknown. It has some similarities to portraits by Jan van Eyck and Rogier van der Weyden, though the fictive stone frame is Memling's invention.

In 1823 it was bought by L.J. Nieuwenhuys, who later sold it to prince William of Orange. It was bought at the auction of William's collection in 1850 by its present owner, the Städelsches Kunstinstitut und Städtische Galerie, in Frankfurt am Main.

== Sources ==
- (in Dutch) Till-Holger Borchert, De portretten van Memling (tentoonstelling Brugge 2005), Ludion, 2005 (nummer 1), p. 151.
