= Miracle of a Dominican Saint =

Painting by Francesco Guardi

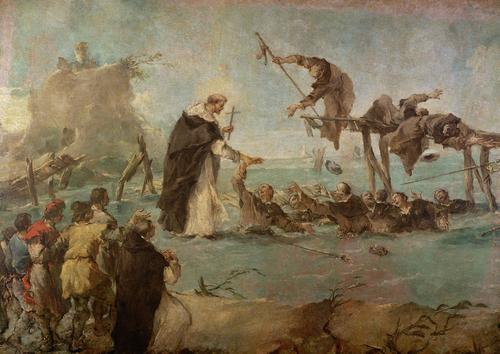
- Artist: Francesco Guardi
- Year: 1763
- Medium: oil on canvas
- Dimensions: 122 cm × 172 cm (48 in × 68 in)
- Location: Kunsthistorisches Museum; Vienna

The Miracle of a Dominican Saint is an oil-on-canvas painting by the Italian painter Francesco Guardi, from 1763. It is held in the collection of the Kunsthistorisches Museum, in Vienna.

== History and provenance ==
The painting was made for the chapel of Saint Dominic in the Church of Saint Peter the Martyr, on the island of Murano, Venice, where it was until 1807; since 1825 it was preserved in the Church of San Giovanni Evangelista in Venice. It was afterwards acquired by Daniele Polacco, in Venice, and later by Count Andrássy, in Budapest. In 1931 it was acquired by the Kunsthistorisches Museum, in Vienna, with the help of the friends of the museum, where it has been since then.

== Description ==
The painting depicts one of the miracles attributed to a Dominican saint, in this case, possibly Gundisalvus of Amarante or St. Hyacinth of Poland, i.e. Jacek Odrovonzh (1183/85–1257), when he was able to save from drowning the monks who had fallen from a bridge, which collapsed during the flood of the Dnieper. Using an almost impressionistic style, which seems influenced by Alessandro Magnasco, the artist portrays the characters and the empty landscape with vigorous brushstrokes. Similarly to his veduta, Guardi parts here with accuracy, creating a painting outside of time and space, where the figures seem to have lost their flesh and acquired a light vibration. The sky and water join each other, and by this union the canvas conveys a sense of infinity.
