= View of the Cannaregio Canal =

Painting by Francesco Guardi

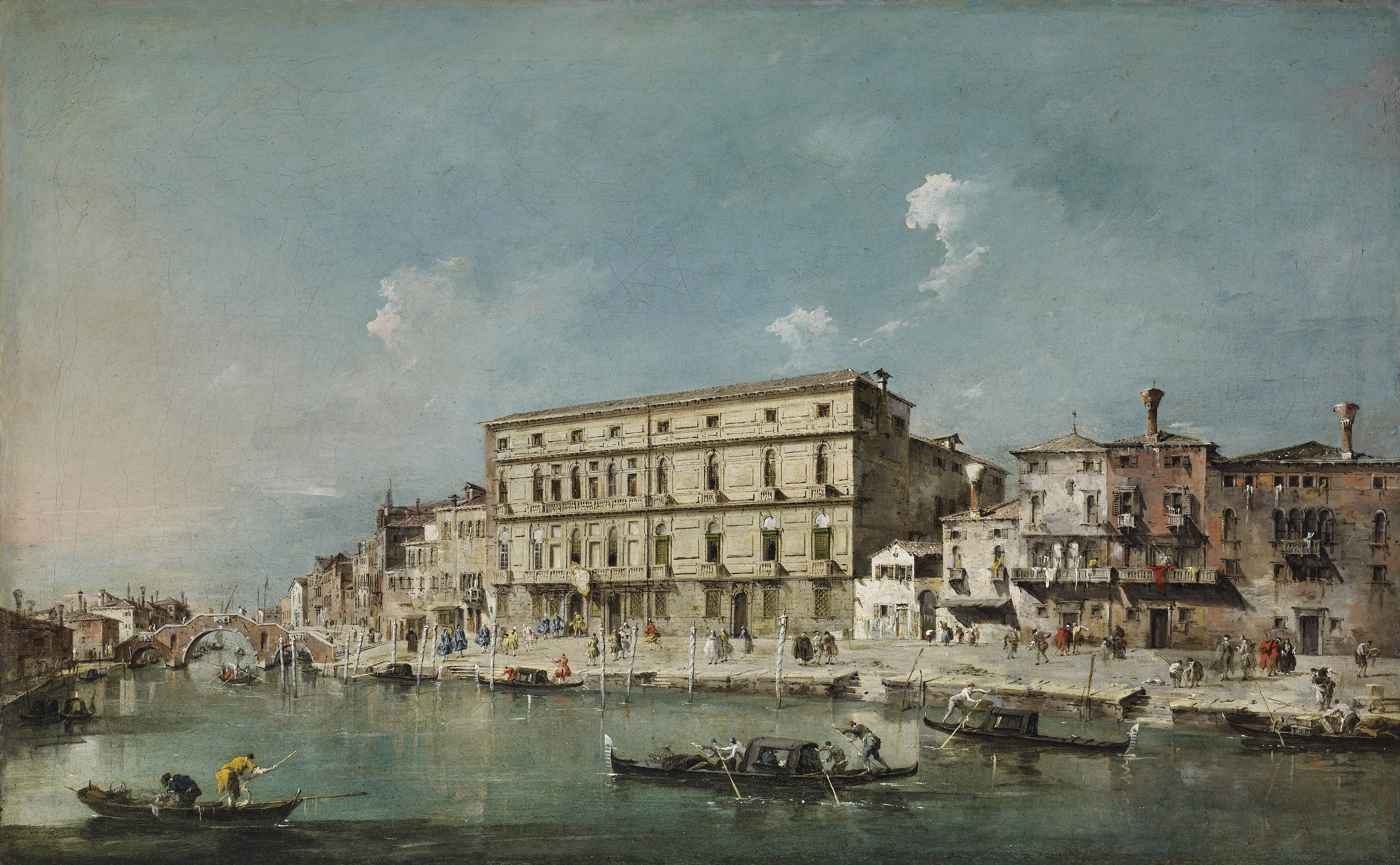
- View of the Cannaregio Canal
- Artist: Francesco Guardi
- Year: c. 1770
- Medium: oil on canvas
- Dimensions: 48.9 cm × 77.5 cm (19.3 in × 30.5 in)
- Location: Frick Collection, New York

View of the Cannaregio Canal is a small oil-on-canvas painting executed ca. 1770 by the Italian painter Francesco Guardi. It measuring 48.9 × 77.5 cm. It is now in the reading room of the Frick Art Reference Library alongside the Regatta in Venice. Both paintings were gifted to the Frick Collection by Helen Clay Frick after her father's death. In the painting, Guardi captures a typical scene of Venetian life on the canals. In this particular veduta, Guardi depicts a section of the northern bank of the Cannaregio Canal, one of Venice’s largest canals, located in the Cannaregio sestiere (district) of the city.

The Palazzo Surian Bellotto is the most prominent building in the painting, named after the two different families who owned the palace: first the Surian family and then the Bellotto family.

The Ponte dei Tre Archi connects the northern bank with the small fragment of the southern bank. The bridge’s arch acts as a viewfinder, focusing the viewer’s gaze onto the tiny patch of pure blue, breaking up the otherwise entirely urban landscape.

Another building that features in this view is the Santa Maria delle Penitenti. It is recognizable by its circular window below the roof and placement behind the Ponte dei Tre Archi. This church was designed by Giorgio Massari in 1725 and the façade was never completed. Guardi takes care to ensure its recognizability despite its modest appearance.

== Sources ==
- M. Vittorio; A. Colquhoun (1957). Francesco Guardi. London; Milan: William Heinemann.
- P. Kelly (1992). "Francesco Guardi and the Conti Del Nord: A New Drawing". The J. Paul Getty Museum Journal (20): 45–52.
