= Giacomo Guardi =

Italian painter (1764–1835)

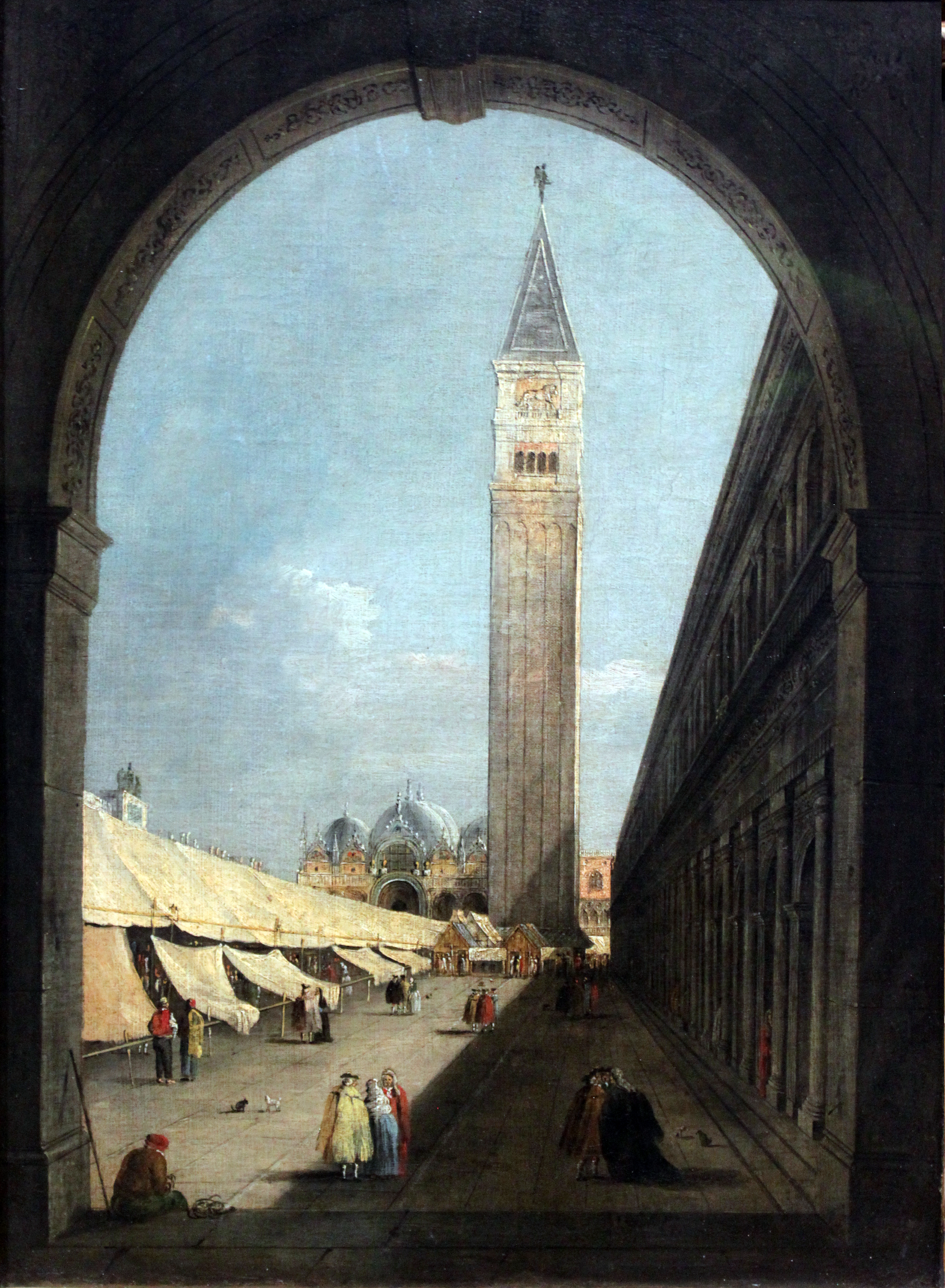
Saint Mark's Place in Venice, 1795, Städelsches Kunstinstitut

Giacomo Guardi (13 April 1764 – 3 November 1835) was an Italian painter from Venice. The son of famous Veduta painter Francesco Guardi, he continued his father's line of work, though without the same level of renown. The majority of his works are quite small views of only minor artistic interest, more akin to postcards than to his father's grand scenes, but he produced several paintings showcasing a notable level of artistic skill as well. Evaluating his legacy is somewhat complicated due to the frequency with which paintings are misattributed to him.
