= Jean-Baptiste Pater =

French painter

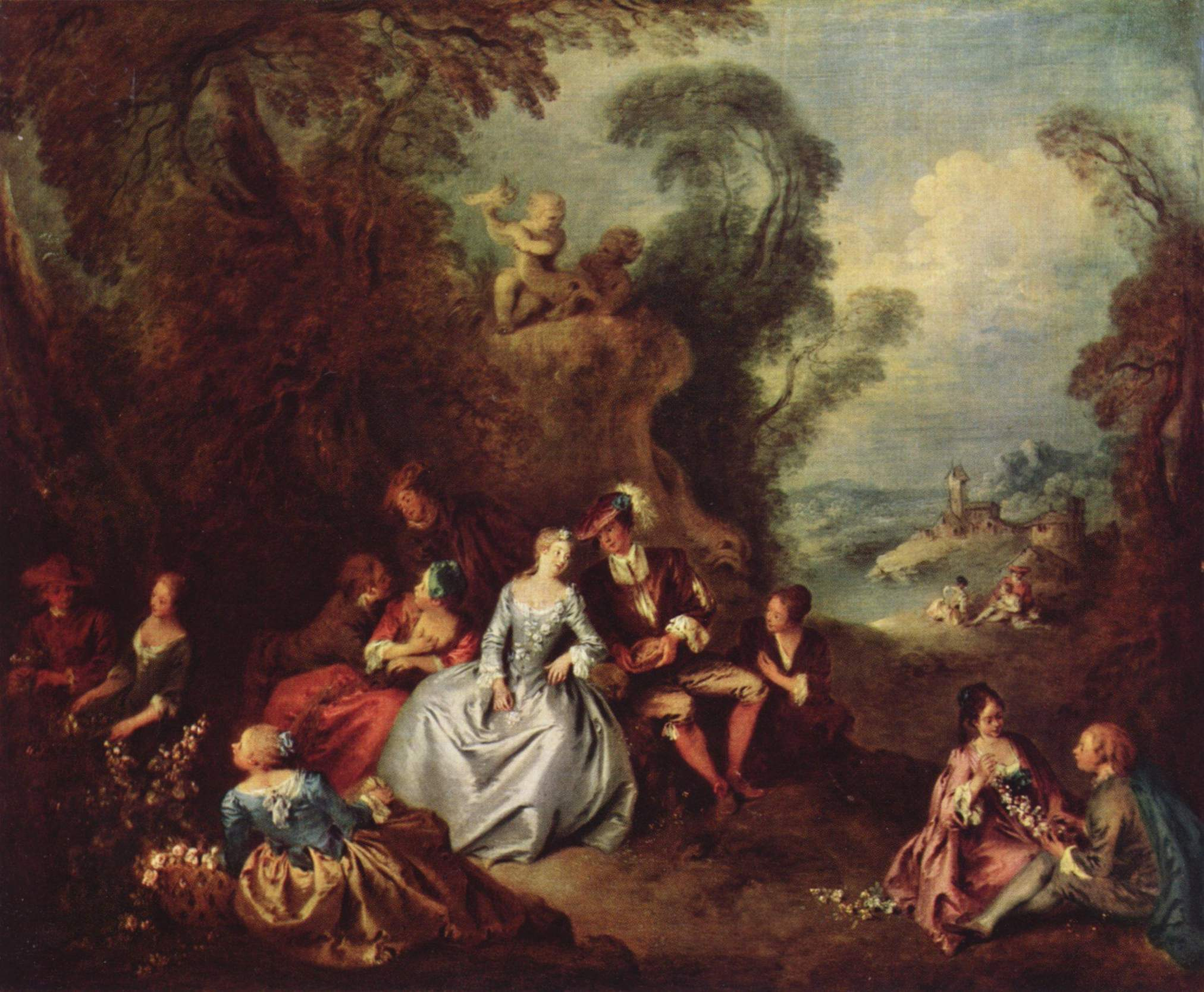
Die Freuden des Landlebens by Jean-Baptiste Pater, c. 1730–1735

Jean-Baptiste Pater (December 29, 1695 – July 25, 1736) was a French rococo painter.

Pater was born in Valenciennes, French Hainaut. He was the son of sculptor Antoine Pater and studied under him before becoming a student of painter Jean-Baptiste Guide. Pater then moved to Paris, briefly becoming a pupil of Antoine Watteau in 1713. Watteau, despite treating Pater badly, had a significant influence on him. However the two quarreled and Pater returned to Valenciennes, where he remained for two years. In 1721, Pater and the dying Watteau reconciled; subsequently Pater became a student of Watteau once again, although only for a month before the latter's death. Pater later claimed to have learnt everything he knew during those few weeks with Watteau. He was accepted into the Académie in 1728, presenting a large military work in the popular Watteau style: La Rejouissance des Soldats (Louvre).

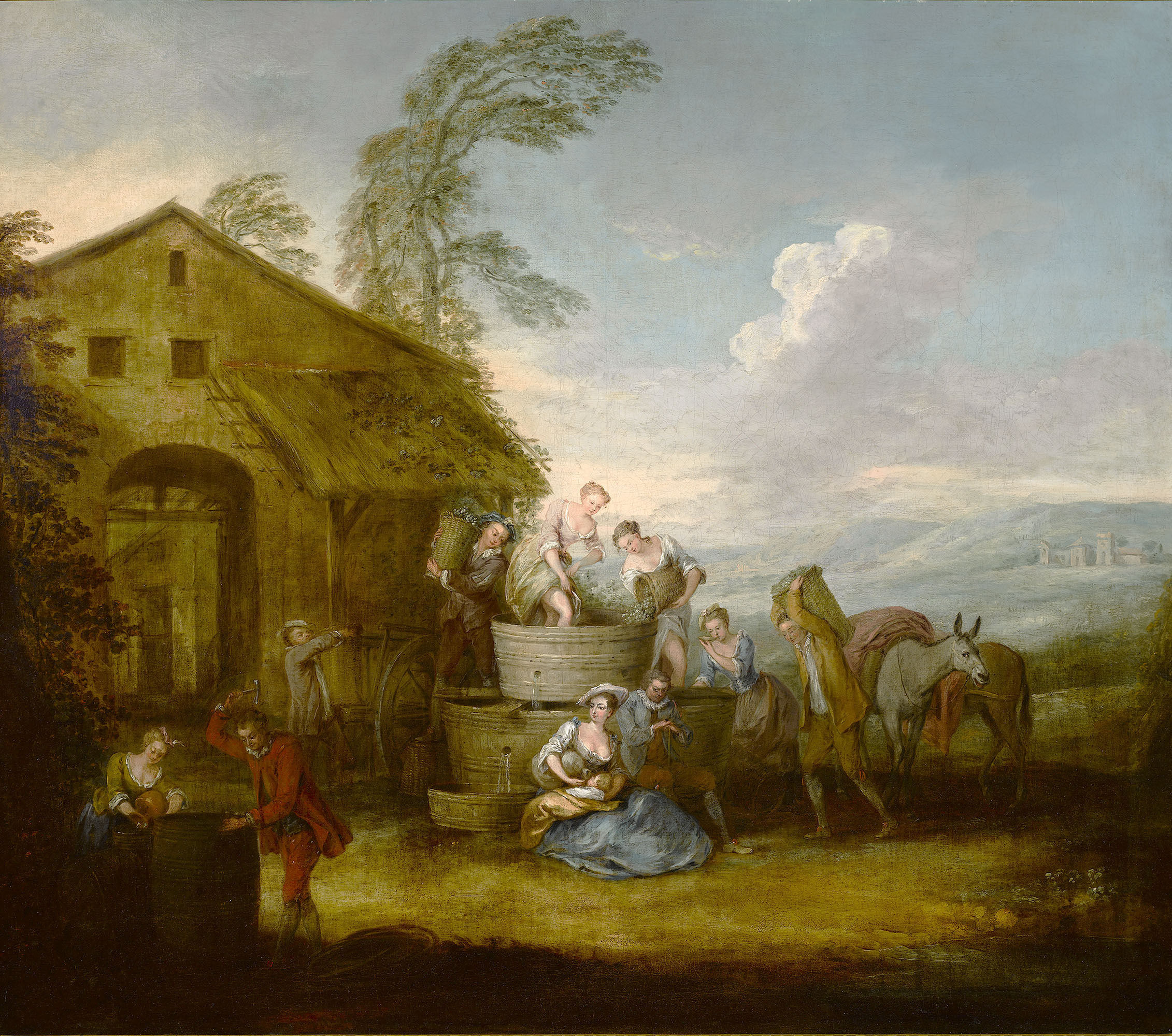
The Grape Harvest by Jean-Baptiste Pater, c. 1720

Pater adopted the popular Fête galante subject matter, heavily imitating his teacher Watteau—indeed he directly copied some of his figures. Pater used a traditional Rococo pastel palette. His most characteristic difference in style from other artists of the time surrounded his use of shimmering lines. His most prominent customer was Frederick the Great, who sat for two portraits in the "Turquerie" style: Le Sultan au Harem and Le Sultan au Jardin. One of Pater's most renowned works is Landscape with a Cart (Schloss Charlottenburg), which is considered to display a feathery application of paint that anticipates Francesco Guardi. The delicately constructed subject matter and figures subordination to the buildings represent a movement away from fête galante, a development that was cut short by Pater's death in 1736.
