= Madonna and Child with Saints Julian and Lawrence =

Painting by Gentile da Fabriano

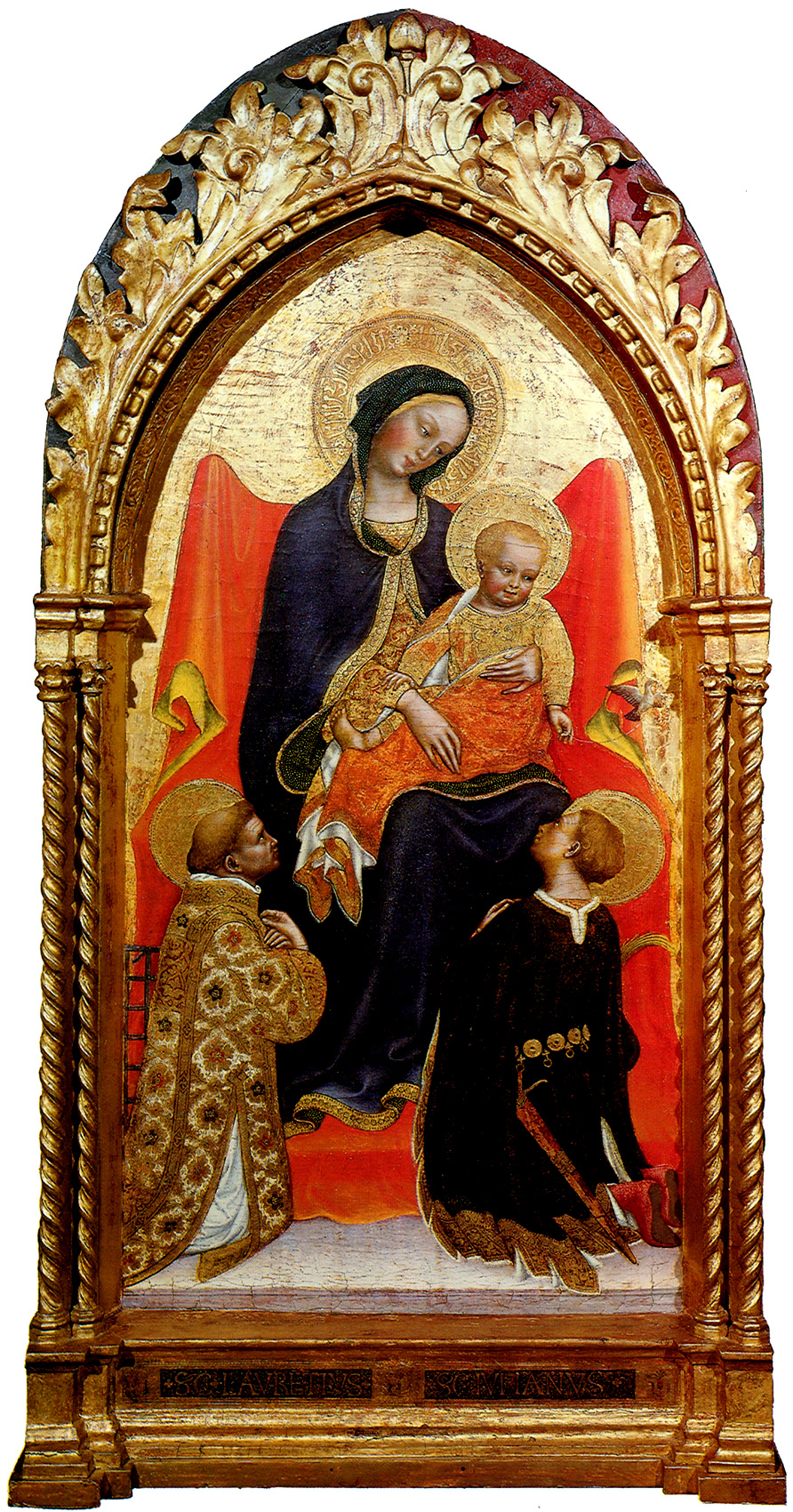
Madonna and Child with Saints Julian and Lawrence (c. 1423–1425)

Madonna and Child with Saints Julian and Lawrence is a c. 1423–1425 tempera and gold leaf on panel painting by the Italian late medieval artist Gentile da Fabriano. It is now in the Frick Collection in New York. To the left is Saint Lawrence in a deacon's dalmatic and holding the gridiron of his martyrdom, whilst to the right is Saint Julian.

It dates from Gentile's Florentine period, between his more Gothic Adoration of the Magi and the Renaissance references of his Quaratesi Polyptych. It is in its original frame, which is also typical of Tuscany, with small pillars, pointed leaves and the inscription "S[an]c[tus] Laure[n]tius" e "S[an]C[tus] Iulianus" (Saint Lawrence and Saint Julian).

The cover of the Madonna's throne is simpler than that of the rich fabrics in the artist's Coronation of the Virgin, instead showing a more sculptural and simple red drape recalling the work of Lorenzo Monaco. The composition of the saints is almost side on, referring to Florentine works such as those of Masaccio, especially the San Giovenale Triptych.
