= Regatta in Venice =

Painting by Francesco Guardi

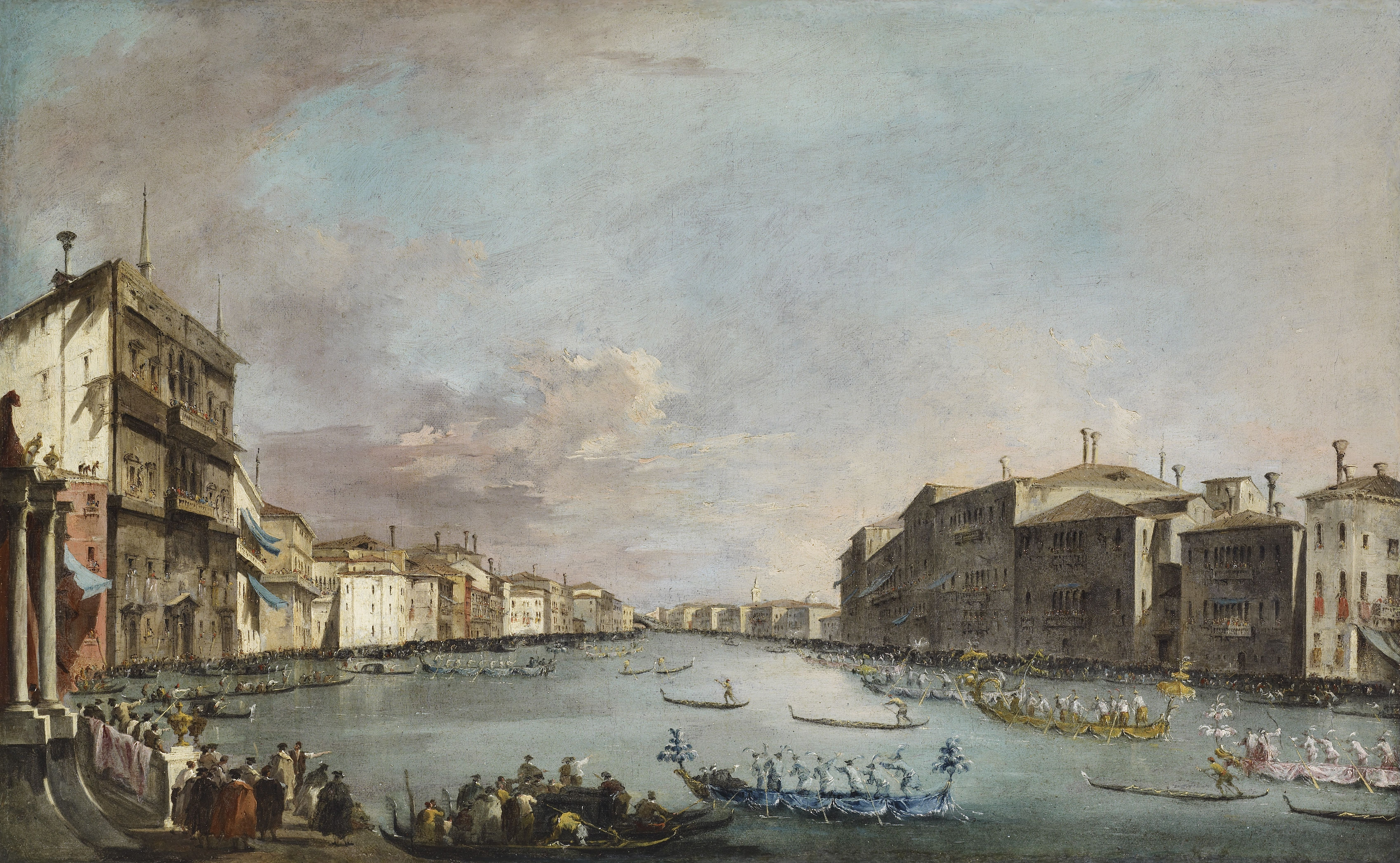
- Artist: Francesco Guardi
- Year: c. 1770
- Medium: oil on canvas
- Dimensions: 48.6 cm × 78.4 cm (19.1 in × 30.9 in)
- Location: Frick Collection, New York

Regatta in Venice is a small oil-on canvas-painting executed c. 1770 by the Italian painter Francesco Guardi. It is now in The Frick Collection, in New York. The painting was gifted to the museum by Helen Clay Frick, the daughter of Henry Clay Frick, who founded the Frick Collection.

The painting depicts the Grand Canal (Venice). In the distance the Rialto Bridge is visible alongside the bell tower of the church of San Bartolomeo and the dome of the Church of Santi Giovanni e Paolo, Venice. Guardi has included this fifteenth century Italian Gothic Church as well as the more recent seventeenth century bell tower, documenting both historical and contemporary changes in the urban landscape. In the foreground of the painting Guardi paints the Palazzo Balbi built by Alessandro Vittoria from 1582 as the residence of the Venetian patrician family of the Balbi.

Guardi fills the Palazzo Balbi with people pouring onto balconies. This brings the viewer's attention to the regatta, the traditional Venetian boat race. Guardi has depicted the most exciting part of the Regatta race: the paleto. The paleto is a turning post that stands in the middle of the Grand Canal. At this juncture, the boats begin to turn around and the winners normally take the lead. The figures in Guardi’s picture push their oars into the water in different directions in a hurry to spin their boats.

The Venetian regatta race was normally preceded by bissone, traditional gondolier boats which would parade before the race to clear the waters and settle rowdy onlookers. Guardi paints these boats in bright colours with figures in matching costumes. Guardi's subject and style appears heavily Dutch influenced, with water, sky and light, prominent features in this architectural and perspectival composition. The cultural event and iconic architectural view was not uncommon in Guardi's time. Indeed, this very scene was also painted by Guardi's predecessor, Canaletto. Canaletto's The Grand Canal from the Palazzo Balbi in the Uffizi Gallery is painted from a similar viewpoint.
