= Francesco Guardi =

Italian painter (1712–1793)

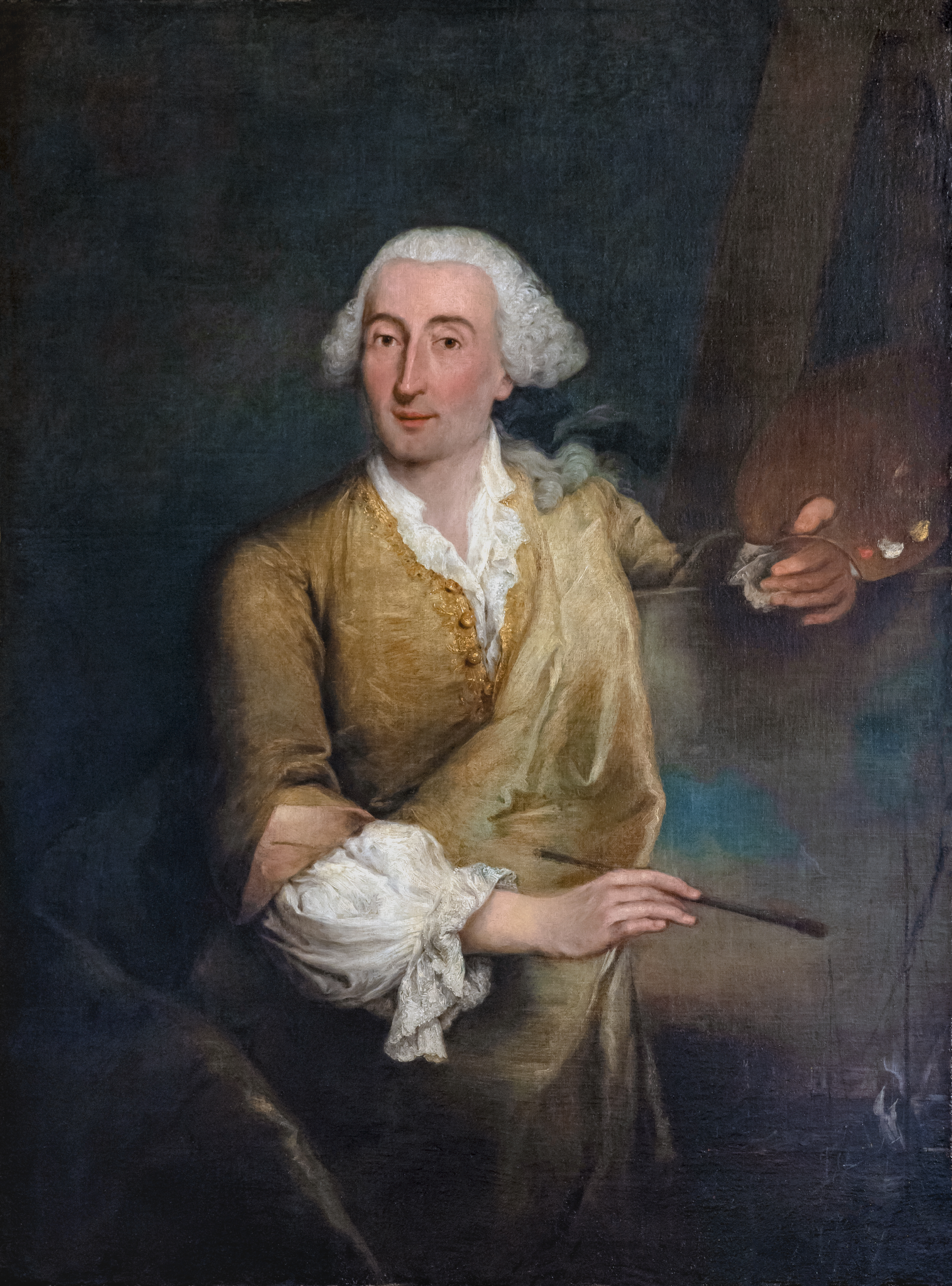
- Francesco Guardi portrayed by Pietro Longhi (1764)
- Born: 5 October 1712; Venice, Republic of Venice (now Italy)
- Died: 1 January 1793 (aged 80); Venice, Republic of Venice
- Known for: Painting
- Movement: Venetian School

Francesco Lazzaro Guardi (Italian pronunciation: [franˈtʃesko ˈgwardi]; 5 October 1712 – 1 January 1793) was an Italian painter, nobleman, and a member of the Venetian School. He is considered to be among the last practitioners, along with his brothers, of the classic Venetian school of painting.

In the early part of his career he collaborated with his older brother Gian Antonio in the production of religious paintings. After Gian Antonio's death in 1760, Francesco concentrated on vedute. The earliest of these show the influence of Canaletto, but he gradually adopted a looser style characterized by spirited brush-strokes and freely imagined architecture.

== Biography ==
Francesco Guardi was born in Venice into a family of nobility from Trentino. His father Domenico (born in 1678) and his brothers Niccolò and Gian Antonio were also painters, later inheriting the family workshop after the father's death in 1716. They probably all contributed as a team to some of the larger commissions later attributed to Francesco. His sister Maria Cecilia married the pre-eminent Veneto-European painter of his epoch, Giovanni Battista Tiepolo.

In 1735, Guardi moved to the workshop of Michele Marieschi, where he remained until 1743. His first certain works are from 1738, for a parish at Vigo d'Anuania, in Trentino. In this period he worked alongside his older brother, Gian Antonio. The first work signed by Francesco is a Saint Adoring the Eucharist (c. 1739).

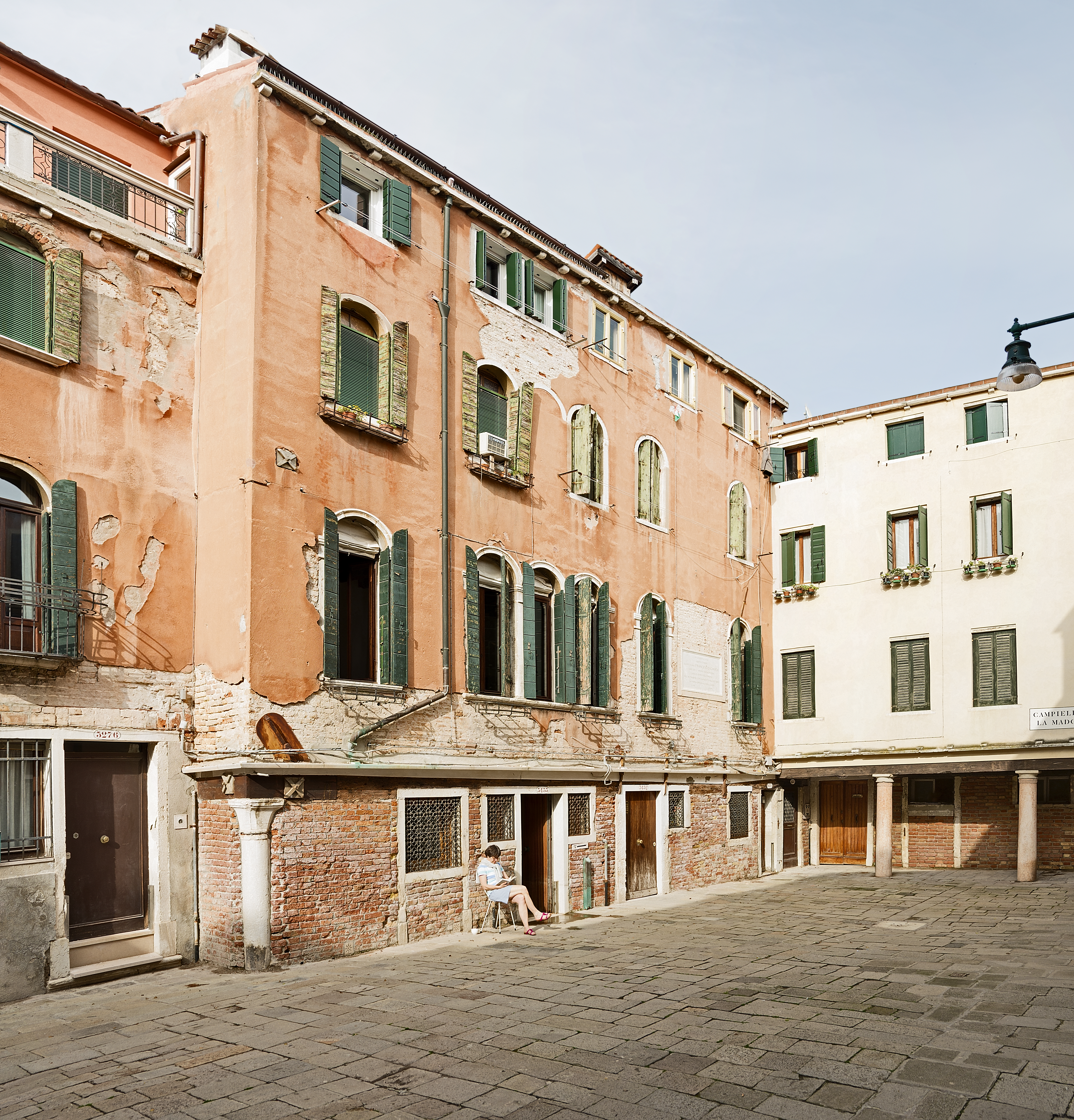
House of Guardi in Cannaregio

His works in this period included both landscapes and figure compositions. His early vedute show influence both from Canaletto and Luca Carlevarijs. On 15 February 1757, he married Maria Mattea Pagani, the daughter of painter Matteo Pagani. In 1760 his brother Gian Antonio died and his first son, Vincenzo, was born. His second son, Giacomo, was born in 1764.

In 1763 he worked in Murano, in the church of San Pietro Martire, finishing a Miracle of a Dominican Saint clearly influenced by Alessandro Magnasco in its quasi-expressionistic style.

Francesco Guardi's most important later works include the Doge's Feasts, a series of twelve canvases celebrating the ceremonies held in 1763 for the election of Doge Alvise IV Mocenigo. In his later years, Canaletto's influence on his art diminished, as shown by the Piazzetta in the Ca' d'Oro of Venice. In circa 1778, he painted the severe Holy Trinity Appearing to Sts. Peter and Paul in the parish church of Roncegno.

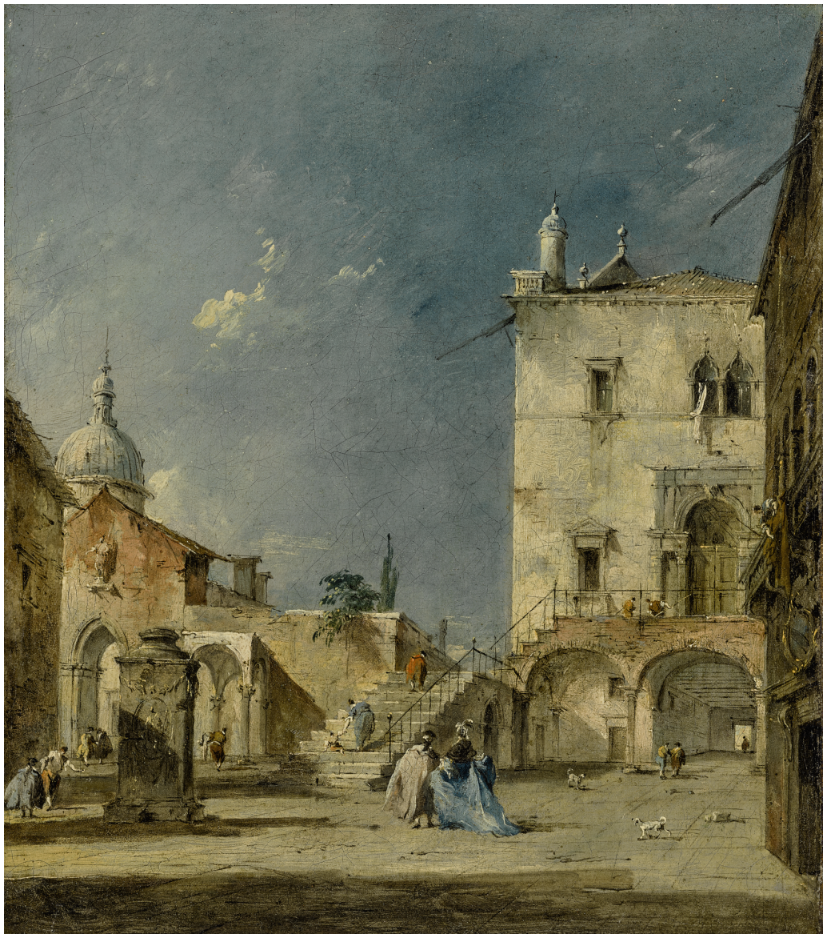
Capriccio View of a Venetian Campo (c. 1780)

In 1782, Guardi was commissioned by the Venetian government six canvases to celebrate the visit of the Russian Grand Dukes to the city, of which only two remain, and two others for that of Pope Pius VI. On September 12 of that year, he was admitted to the Fine Art Academy of Venice.

A stronger attention to colours is present in late works such as the Concerto of 80 Orphans of 1782, now in Munich, and in the Façade of Palace with Staircase in the Accademia Carrara of Bergamo.

Guardi died at Campiello de la Madona in Cannaregio (Venice) in 1793.

== Mature style ==
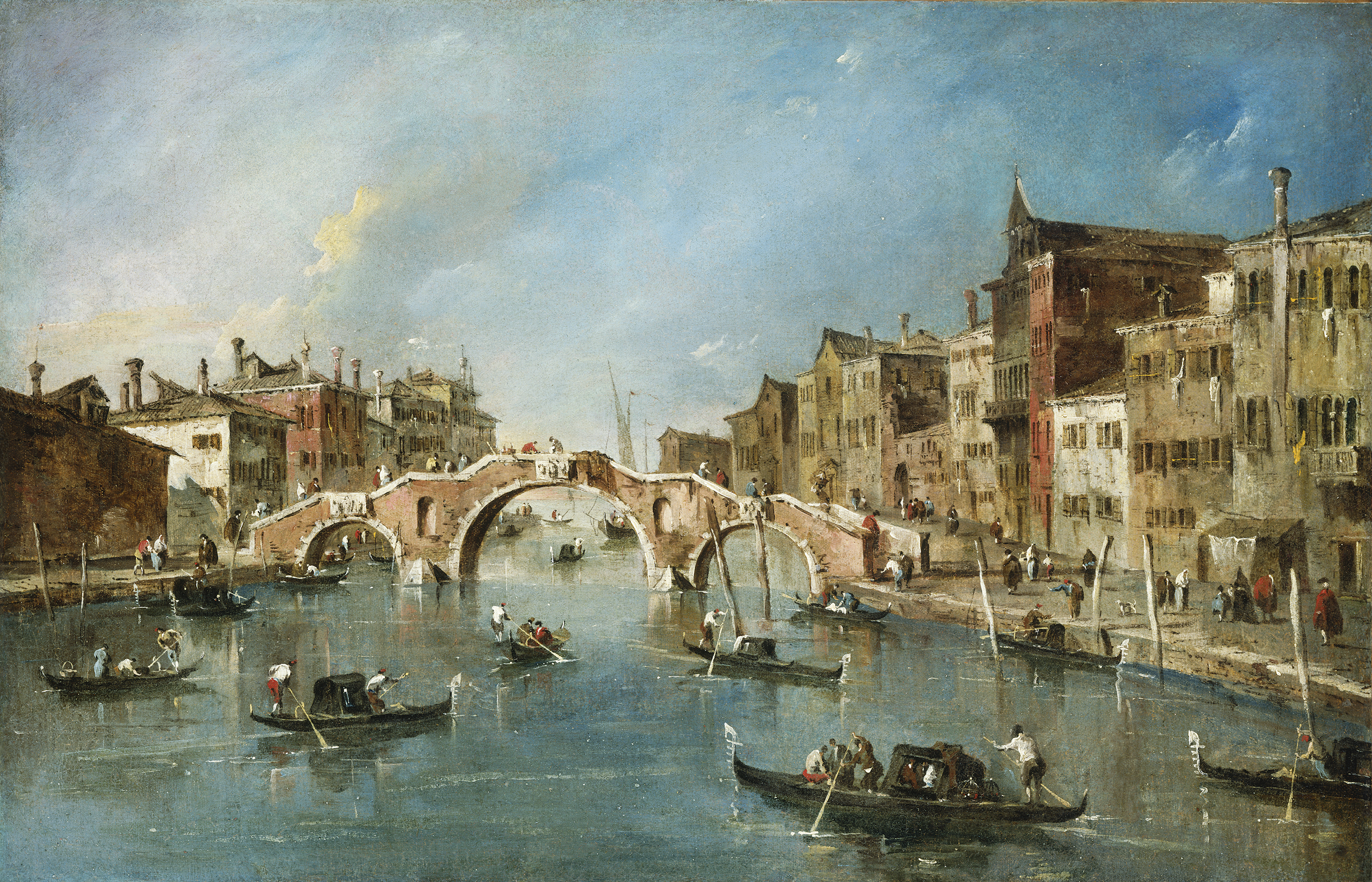
View on the Cannaregio Canal, Venice, c. 1775–1780, National Gallery of Art

Among all the paintings attributed to either Francesco and his brother Gian Antonio Guardi, the most praised work is not a landscape, but instead the airy sfumato Story of Tobit painted for the organ loft in the small Chiesa dell'Angelo San Raffaele. To quote from the Web Gallery of Art:

Perspective, organized aerial space, the Palladian solidity of Tiepolo... are exchanged for a personal style of coloured handwriting – now brilliantly calligraphic, and now brilliantly cloudy.

Guardi's painterly style is known as pittura di tocco (of touch) for its small dotting and spirited brush-strokes. This looser style of painting had been used by Giovanni Piazzetta and Sebastiano Ricci, and recalls, in some religious themes, the sweetened sfumato of Barocci's Bolognese style. In this he differs from the more linear and architecturally accurate style of Canaletto's painting. This style, a century later, would make Guardi's works highly prized by the French Impressionists.

Canaletto, as a vedutista, concentrated on glamorous urban architecture erected by the Serene Republic; on the other hand, in Guardi, the buildings often appear to be melting and sinking into a murky lagoon. Canaletto's canvases often have intricate linear and brilliant details, and depict Venice in sunny daylight. Guardi paints clouded skies above a city at dusk. These contrasts, however, simplify the facts, since Canaletto often painted the drab communal life and neighborhoods (creating in them some epic artistic qualities), while Guardi did not avoid sometimes painting the ceremonies of Ducal Venice. Ultimately, Guardi's paintings evoke the onset of the dissipation. The citizenry has shrunken to an impotent lilliputian crowd of "rubber-neckers", unable to rescue the crumbling Republic, as for example in the Fire in the Oil Depot in San Marcuola. It was fitting depiction of the rapidly declining empire, which had declined, in Napoleon's assessment, into a "drawing room of Europe" peopled with casinos, carnivals, and courtesans for hire.

== Gallery ==
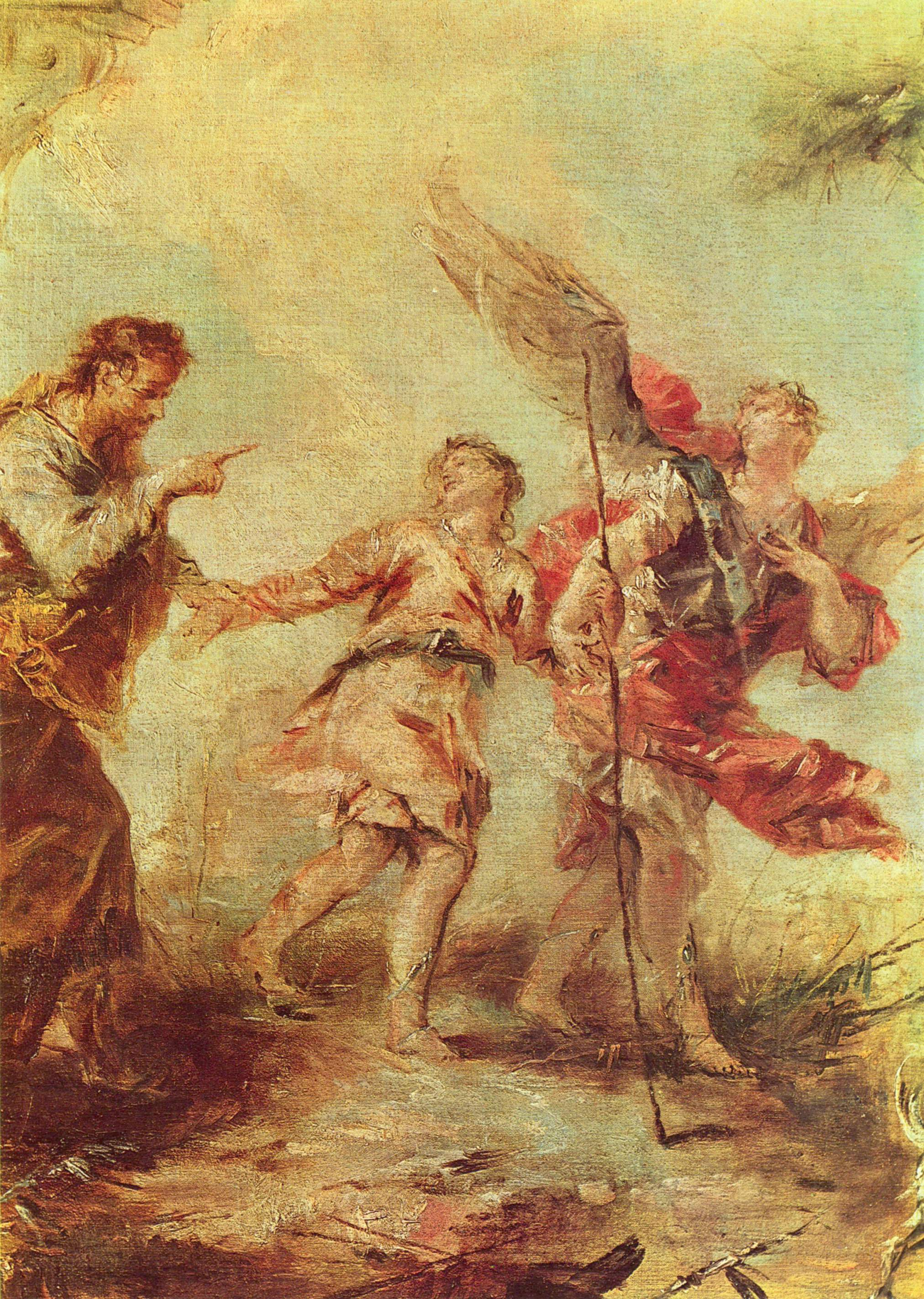
Departure of Tobias and Angel, Chiesa dell'Angelo San Raffaele (Venice)

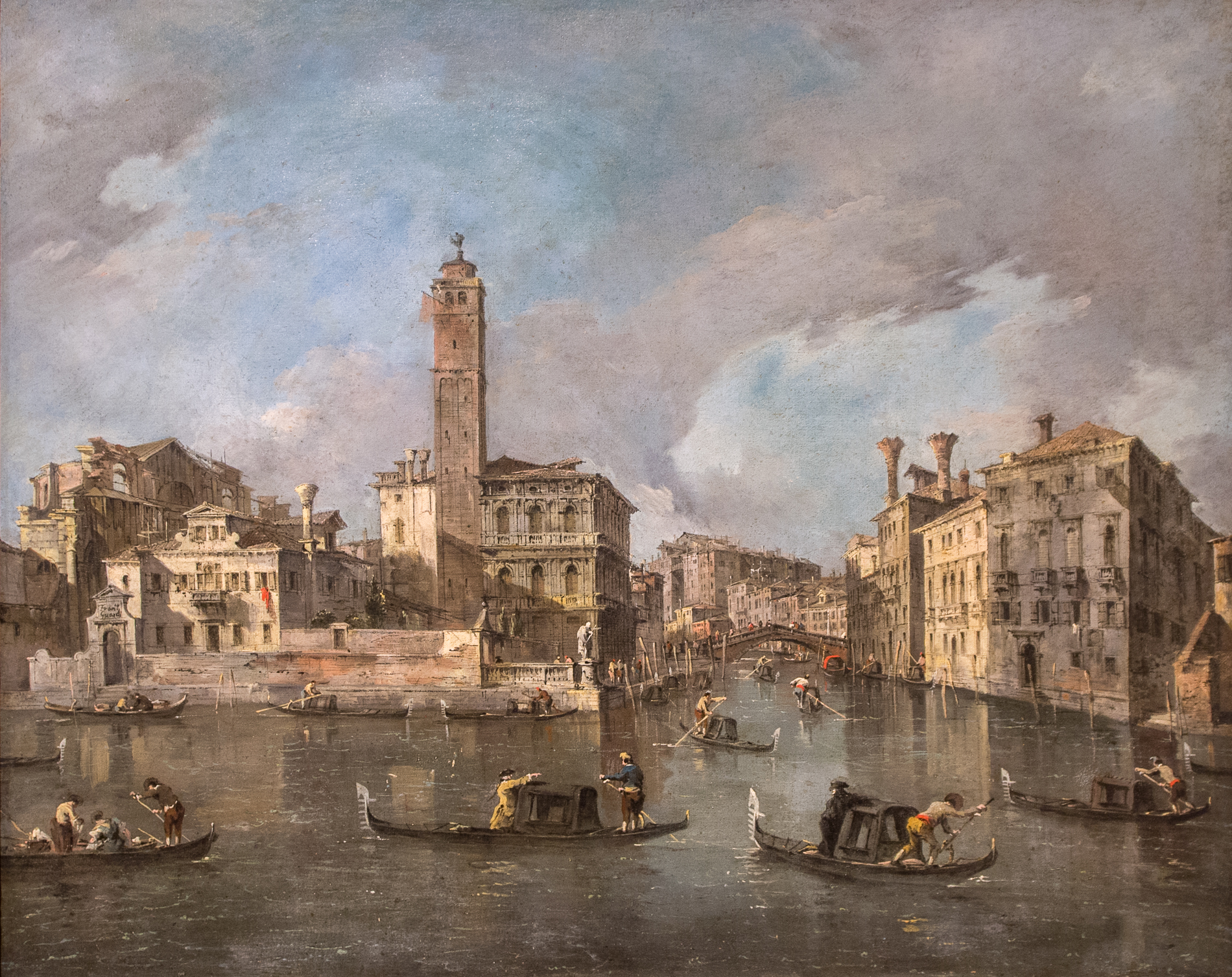
View on the Grand Canal at San Geremia, Venice (1760–1765), Frick Collection

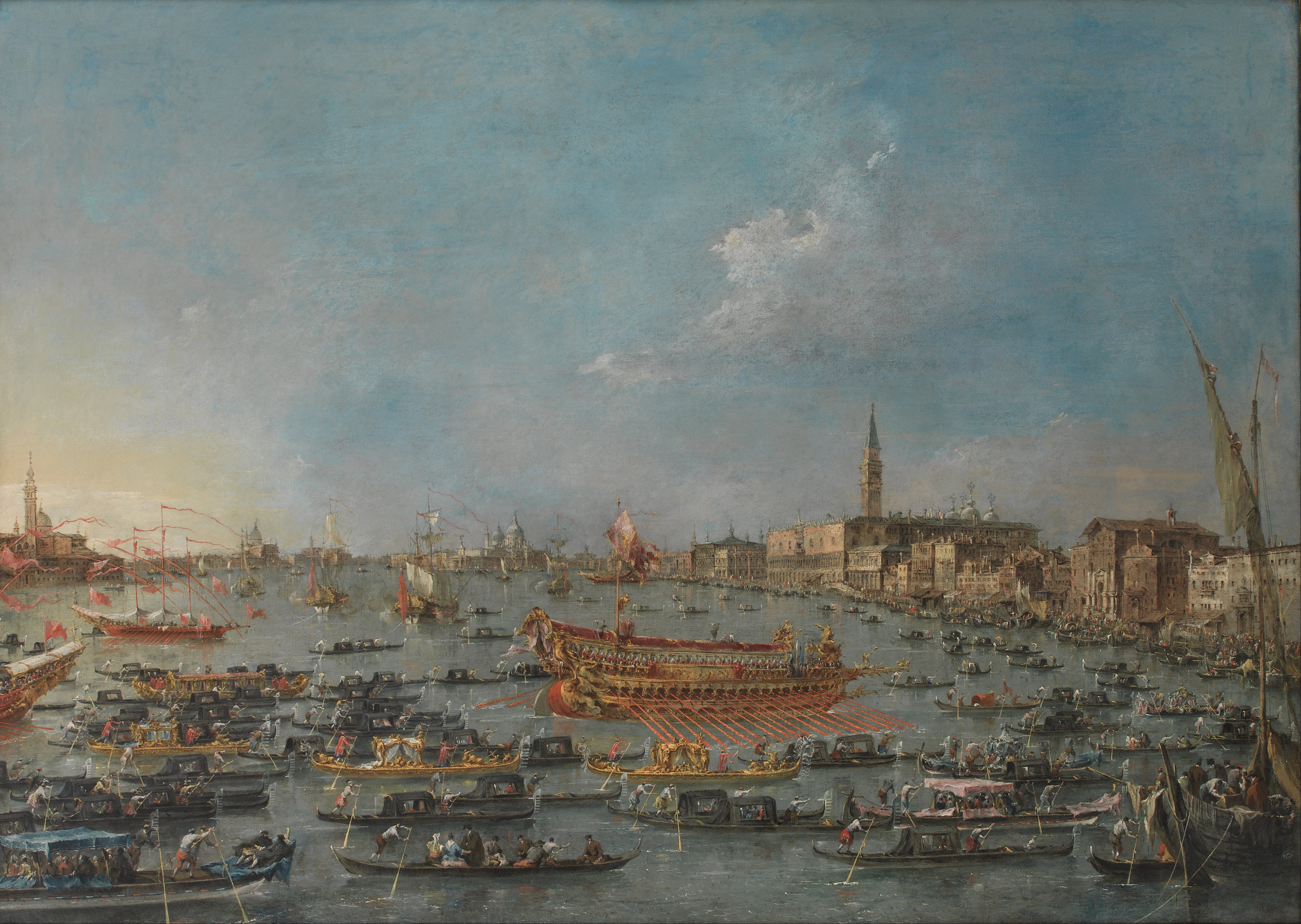
The Bucintoro Festival of Venice (1780–1793), National Gallery of Denmark

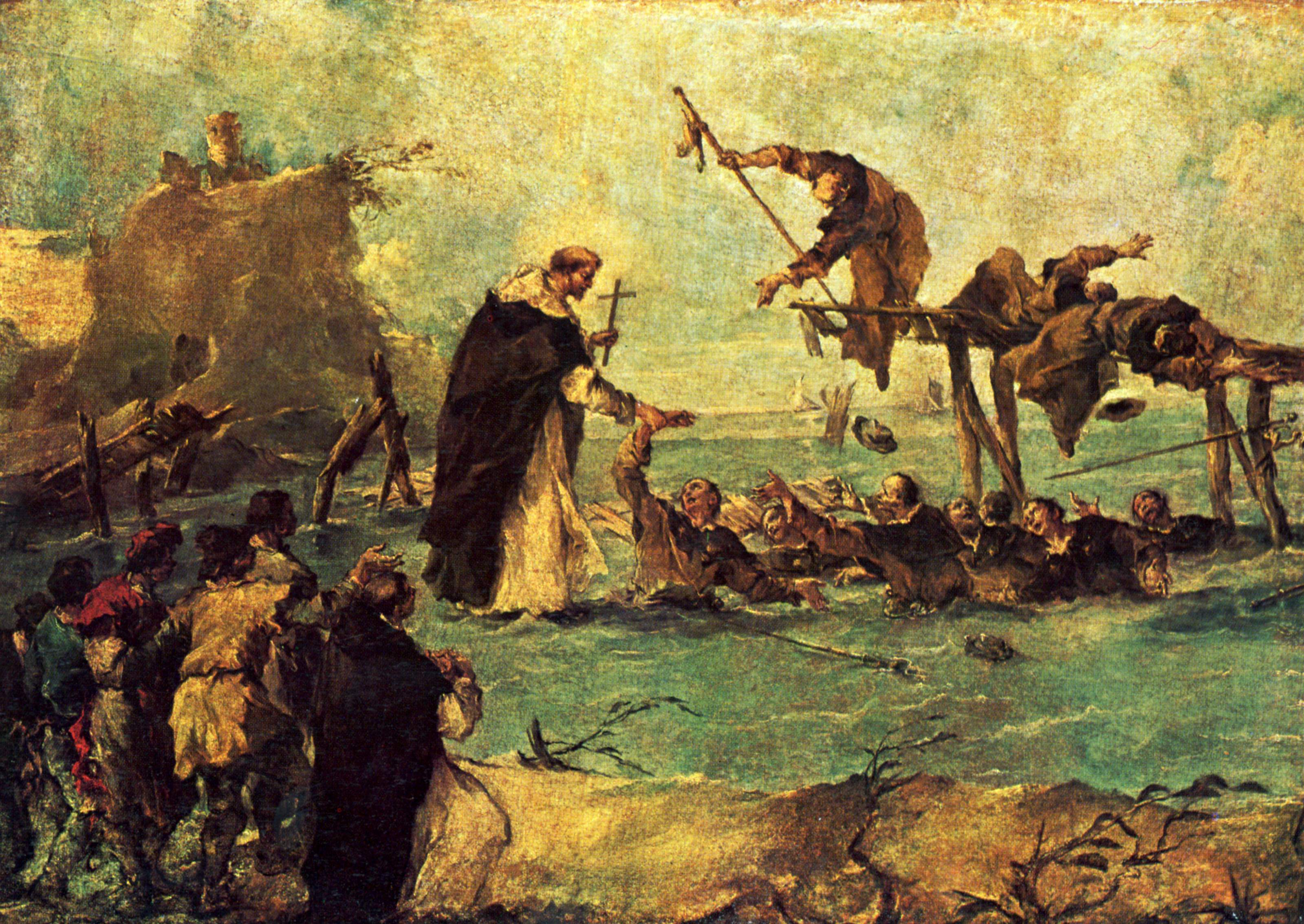
Miracle of a Dominican Saint (1763), private collection

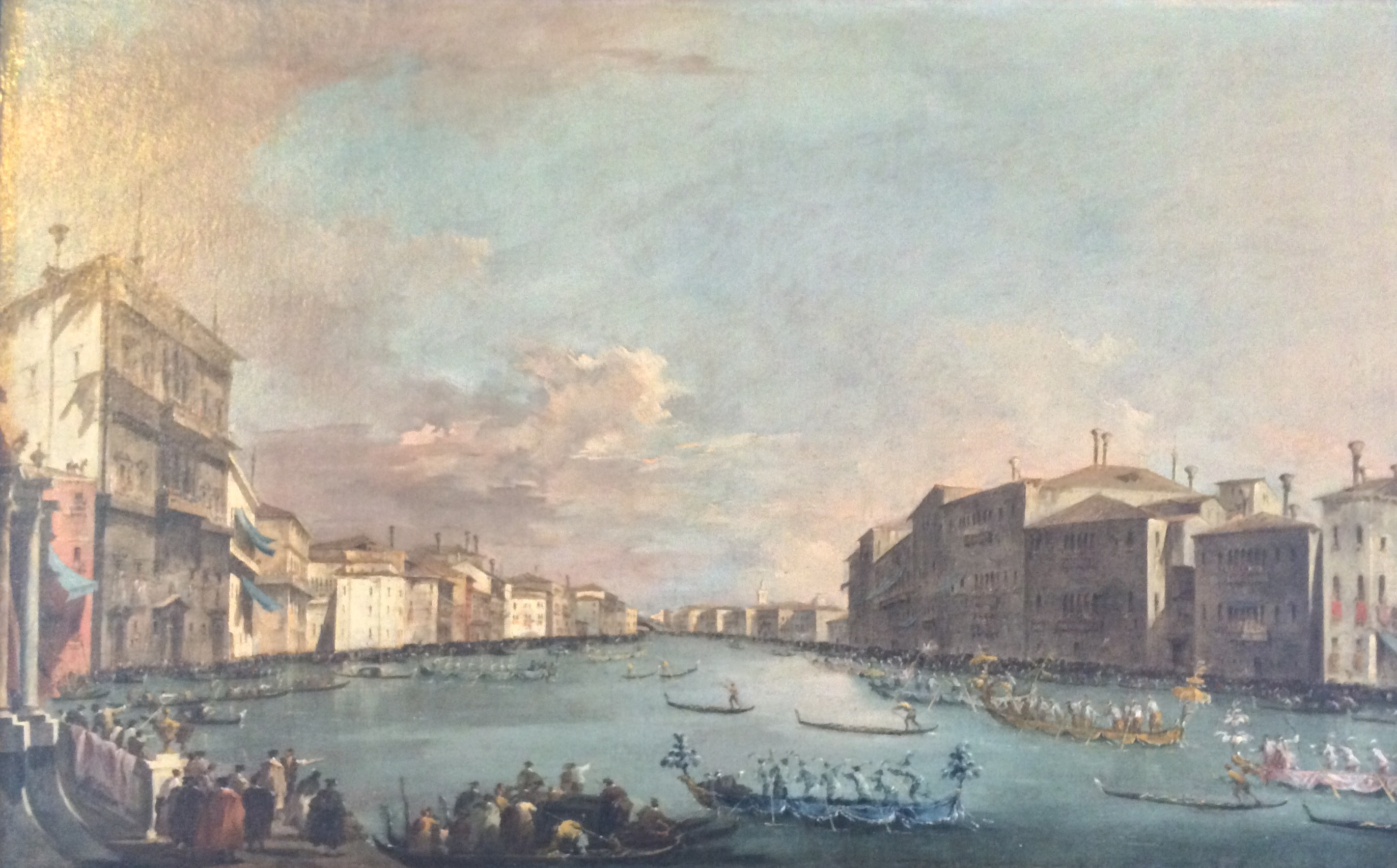
Regatta in Venice (1770), Frick Collection

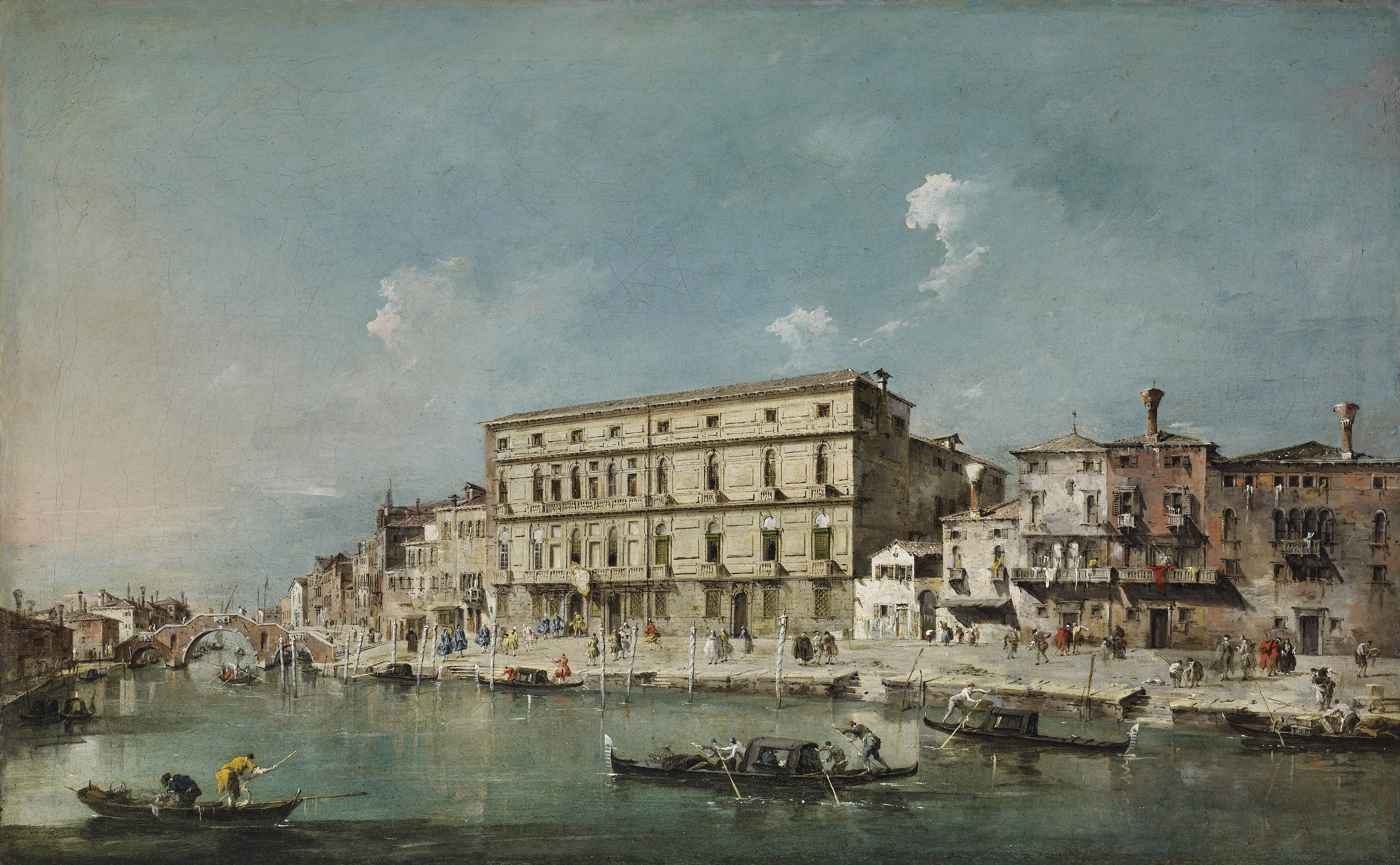
View of the Cannaregio Canal (c. 1770)

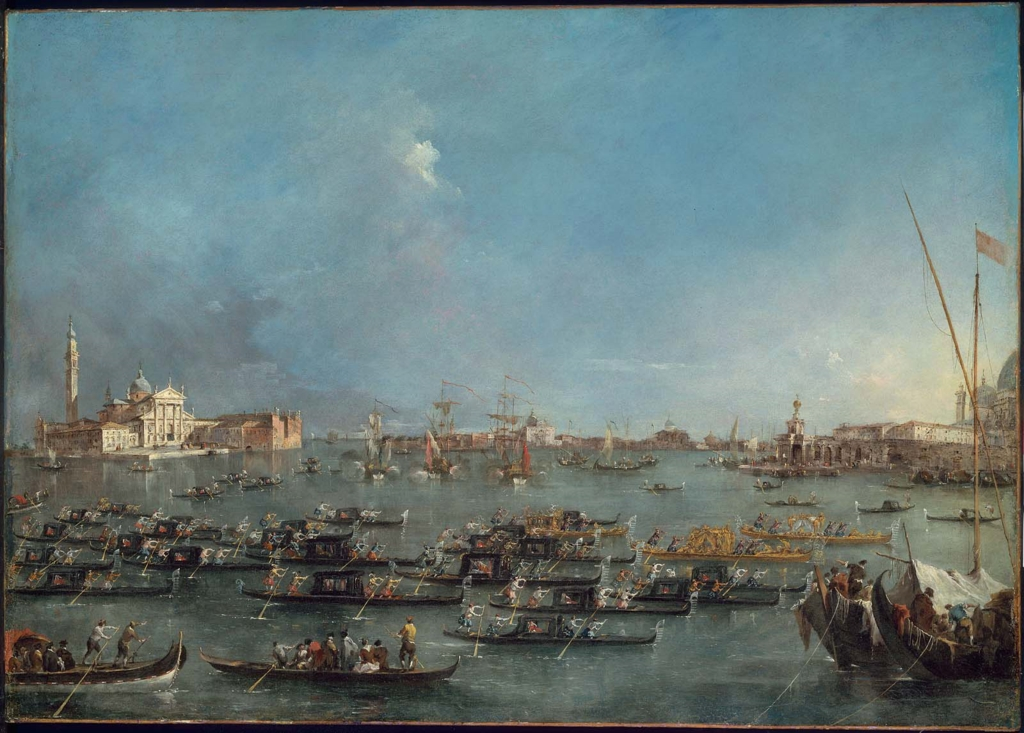
Procession of Gondolas in the Bacino di San Marco (c. 1782), Museum of Fine Arts, Boston

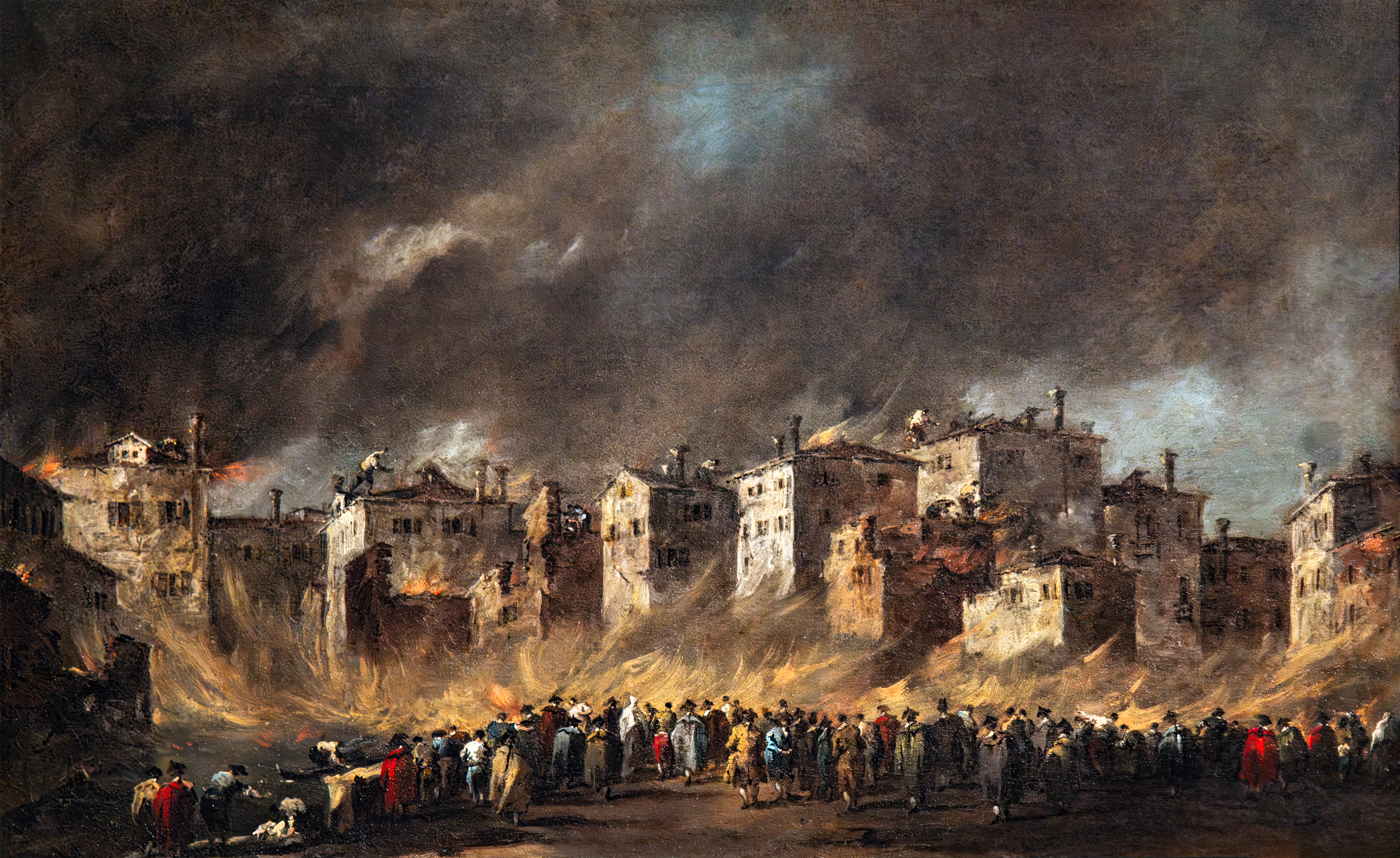
Fire in the Oil Depot in San Marcuola (1789), Gallerie dell'Accademia

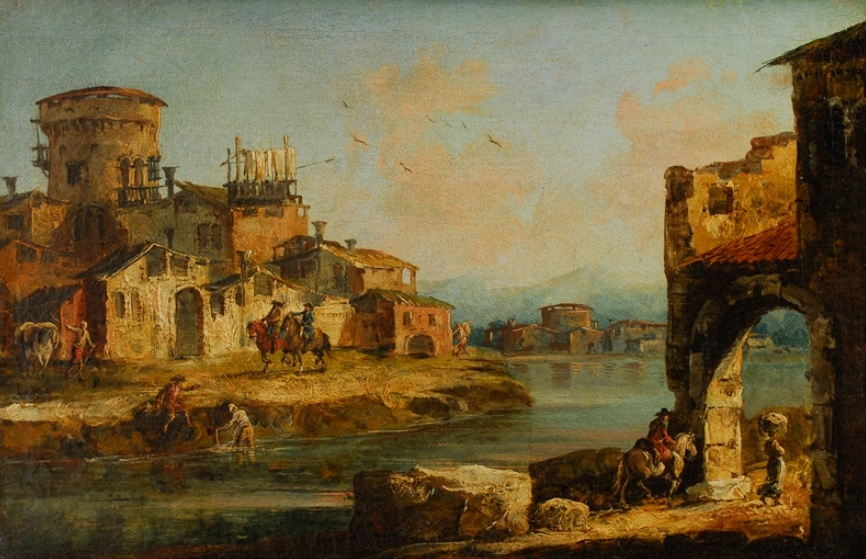
Venice landscape, Ryazan fine art museum, Ryazan

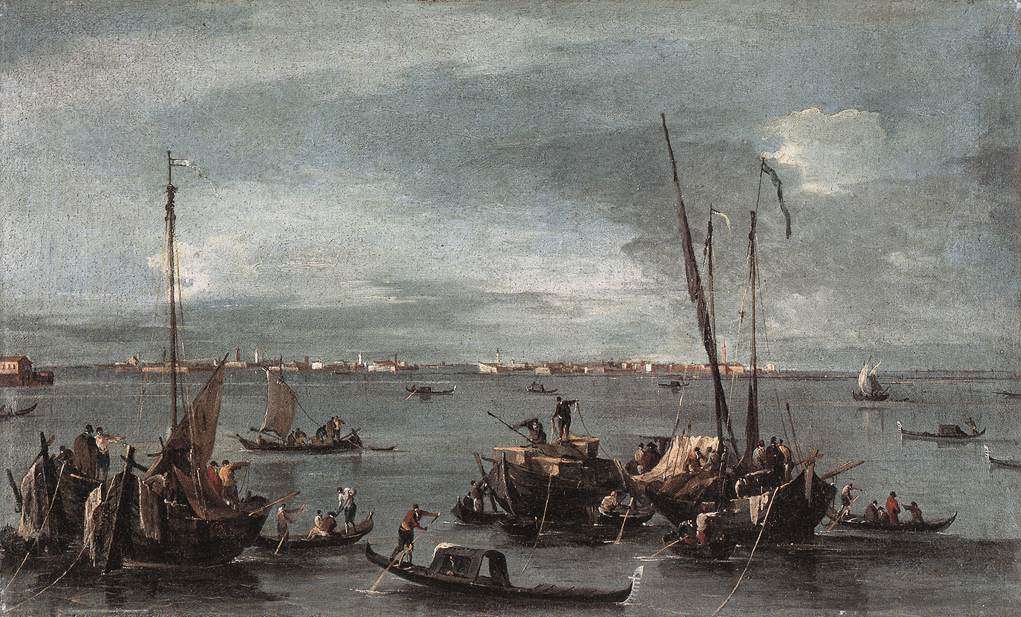
Lagoon Looking Towards Murano from the Fondamenta Nuova (1765-1770), Fitzwilliam Museum

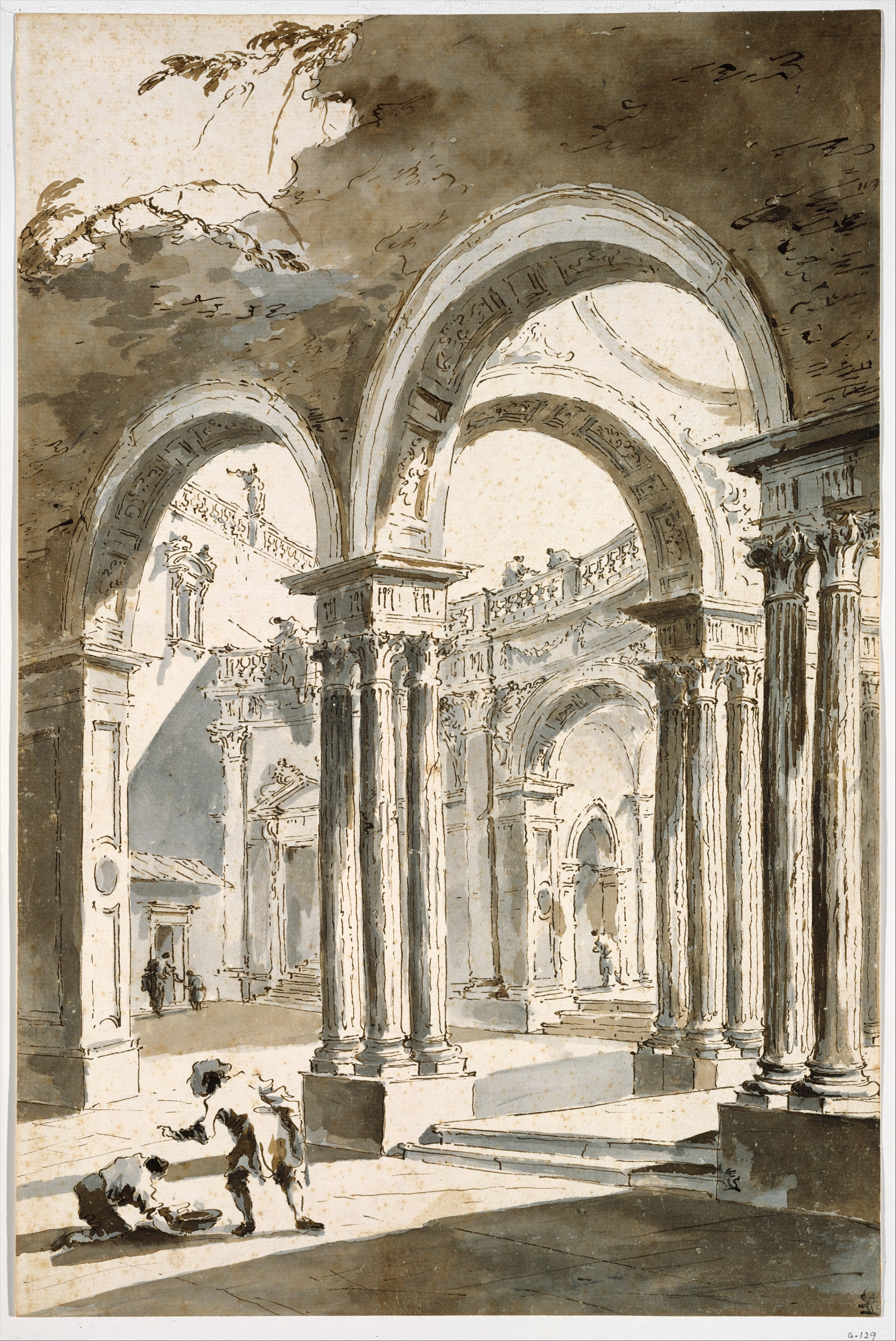
A Colonnade, Partly Ruined, with Figures (1780 – 90), Metropolitan Museum of Art
