= Portrait of a Man (Hans Memling) =

C. 1470 oil painting by Hans Memling

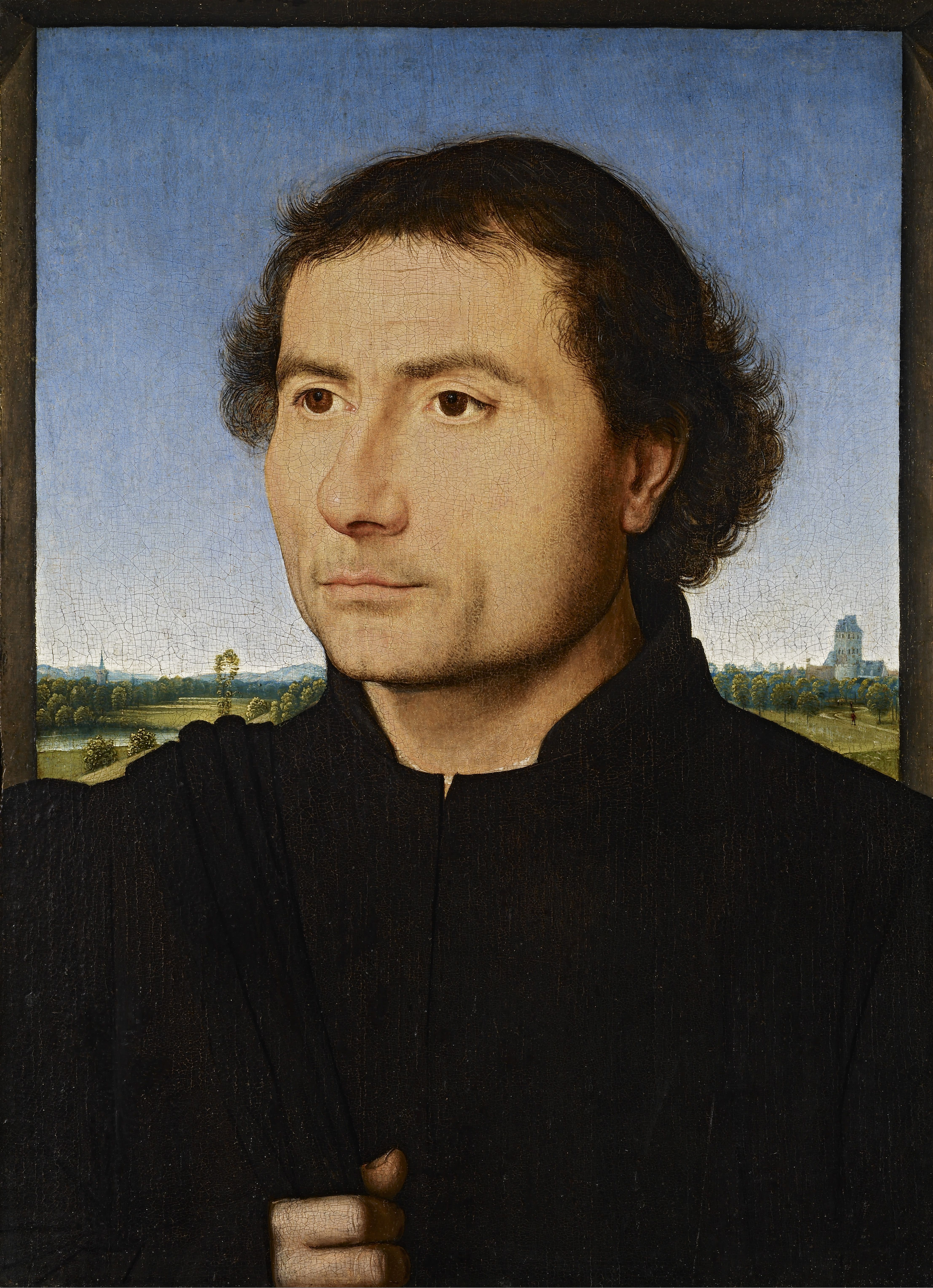
- Artist: Hans Memling
- Year: c.1470
- Medium: oil paint, panel
- Movement: Early Netherlandish painting
- Dimensions: 33.3 cm (13.1 in) × 23.2 cm (9.1 in)
- Location: Frick Collection
- Accession: 1968.1.169

Portrait of a Man (Dutch: Portret van een man) is a c. 1470 oil-on-panel painting by Hans Memling. It is now in the Frick Collection in New York, which it entered in 1968 via the Duveen art dealership.

It was first identified and published as a Memling in 1937. At the time, it was in the collection of Joseph Baron van der Elst (1896-1971) in Vienna and then in his castle at Oostkerke.

== Sources ==
- Till-Holger Borchert, De portretten van Memling (tentoonstelling Brugge 2005), Ludion, 2005 (nummer 2), p. 152.
