= Art of Europe =

Leonardo da Vinci's Mona Lisa is an Italian art masterpiece famous worldwide. Considered an archetypal masterpiece of the Italian Renaissance, it has normally been on display at the Louvre in Paris since 1797.

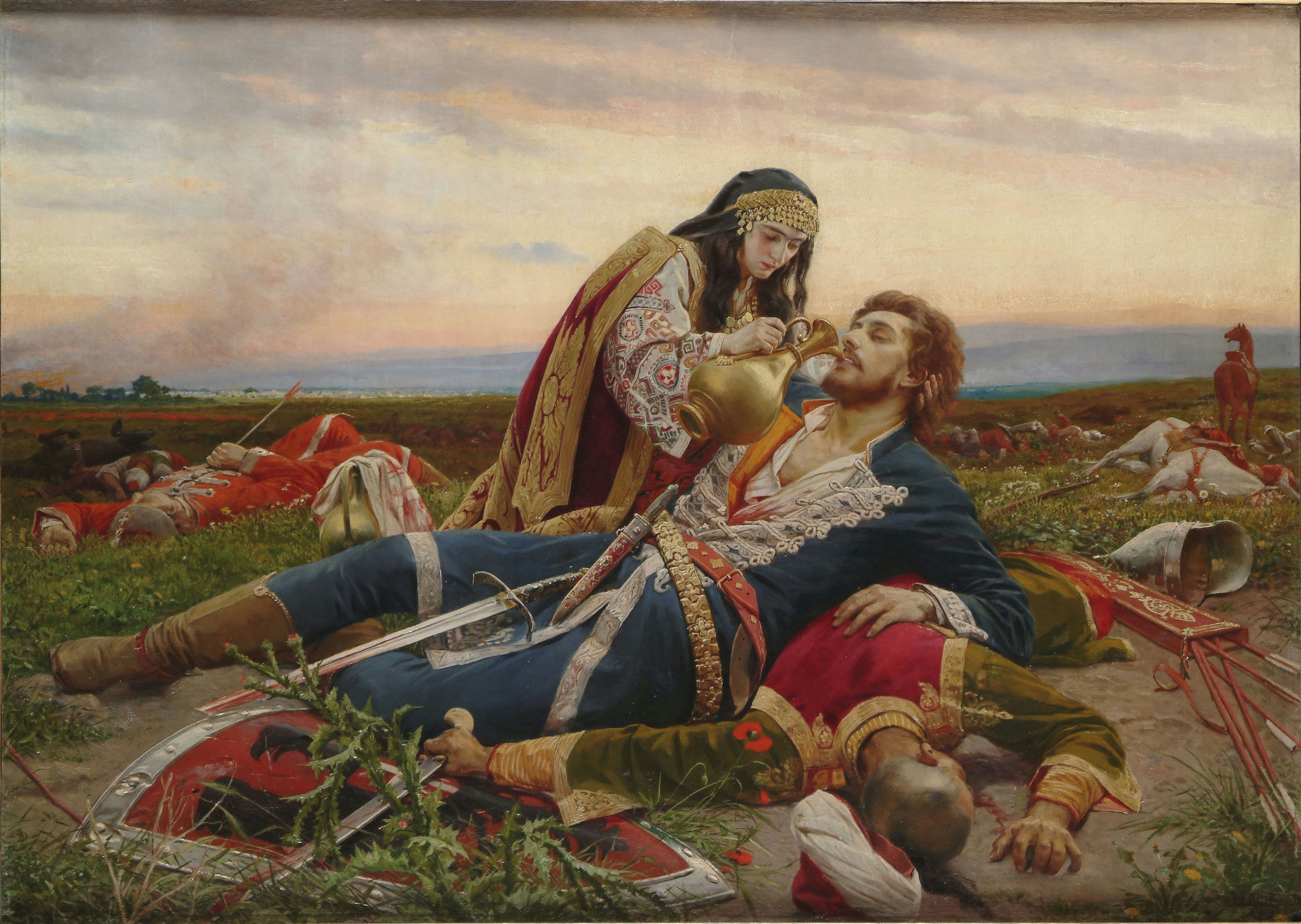
Maiden of the Blackbird's Field; by Uroš Predić; 1919; oil on canvas; 1.95 x 2.64m; National Museum of Serbia (Belgrade, Serbia)

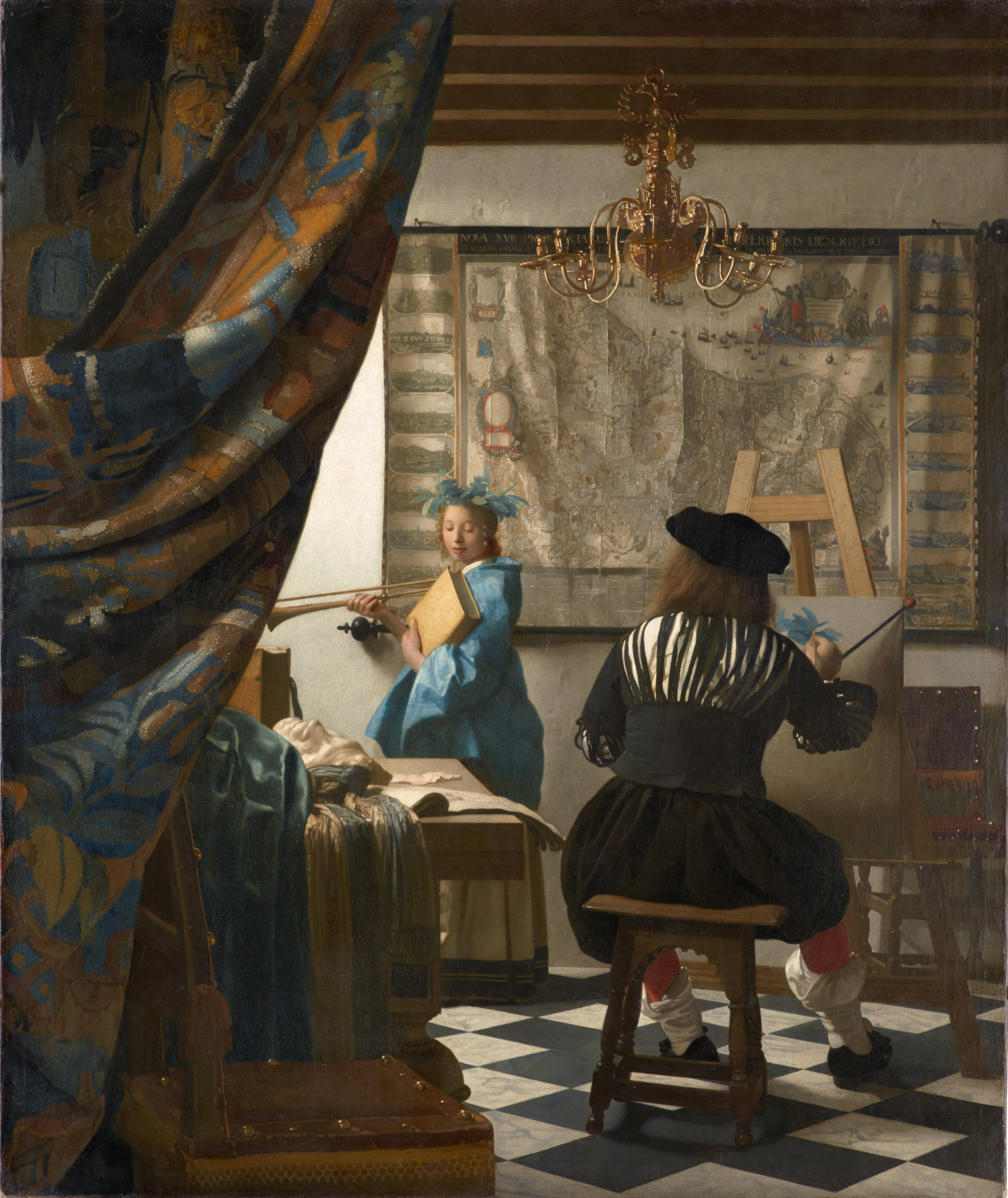
The Art of Painting; by Johannes Vermeer; 1666–1668; oil on canvas; 1.3 x 1.1 m; Kunsthistorisches Museum (Vienna, Austria)

The art of Europe, also known as Western art, encompasses the history of visual art in Europe. European prehistoric art started as mobile Upper Paleolithic rock and cave painting and petroglyph art and was characteristic of the period between the Paleolithic and the Iron Age. Written histories of European art often begin with the Aegean civilizations, dating from the 3rd millennium BC. However, a consistent pattern of artistic development within Europe becomes clear only with Ancient Greek art, which was adopted and transformed by Rome and, with the Roman Empire, was carried across much of Europe, North Africa and Western Asia.

The influence of the art of the Classical period waxed and waned throughout the next two thousand years, seeming to slip into a distant memory in parts of the Medieval period, to re-emerge in the Renaissance, suffer a period of what some early art historians viewed as "decay" during the Baroque period, to reappear in a refined form in Neo-Classicism and to be reborn in Post-Modernism.

Before the 1800s, the Christian church was a major influence on European art, and commissions from the church provided the major source of work for artists. In the same period, there was also a renewed interest in classical mythology, great wars, heroes and heroines, and themes not connected to religion. Most art of the last 200 years has been produced without reference to religion and often with no particular ideology at all, but art has often been influenced by political issues, whether reflecting the concerns of patrons or the artist.

European art is arranged into many stylistic periods, which, historically, overlap each other as different styles flourished in different areas. Broadly the periods are: Classical, Byzantine, Medieval, Gothic, Renaissance, Baroque, Rococo, Neoclassical, Modern, Postmodern and New European Painting.

== Prehistoric art ==
European prehistoric art is an important part of the European cultural heritage. Prehistoric art history is usually divided into four main periods: Stone Age, Neolithic, Bronze Age, and Iron Age. Most of the remaining artifacts of this period are small sculptures and cave paintings.

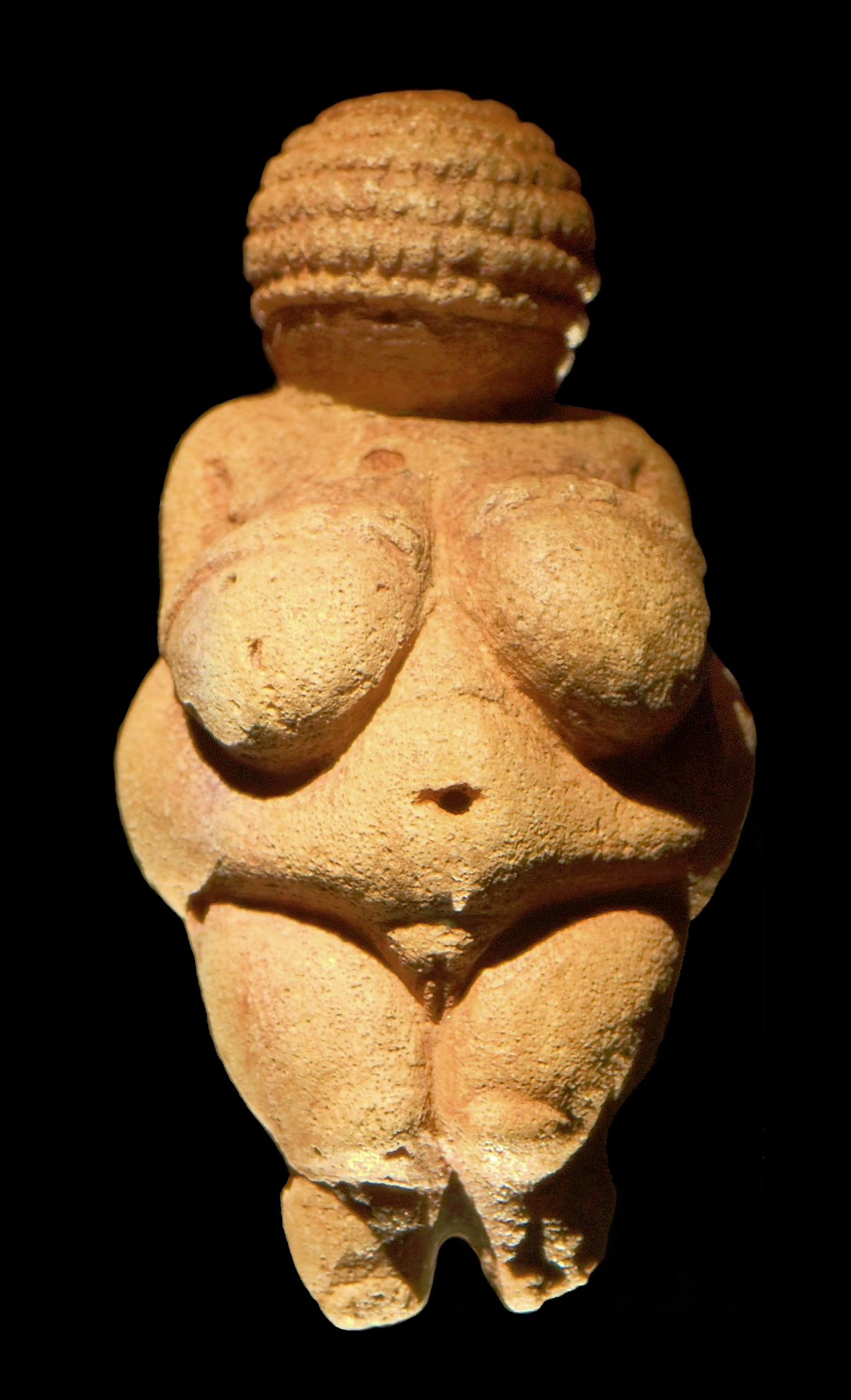
Venus of Willendorf; c. 26,000 BC (the Gravettian period); limestone with ocre coloring; Naturhistorisches Museum (Vienna, Austria)

Much surviving prehistoric art is small portable sculptures, with a small group of female Venus figurines such as the Venus of Willendorf (24,000–22,000 BC) found across central Europe; the 30 cm tall Löwenmensch figurine of about 30,000 BCE has hardly any pieces that can be related to it. The Swimming Reindeer of about 11,000 BCE is one of the finest of several Magdalenian carvings in bone or antler of animals in the art of the Upper Paleolithic, though they are outnumbered by engraved pieces, which are sometimes classified as sculpture. With the beginning of the Mesolithic in Europe figurative sculpture greatly reduced, and remained a less common element in art than relief decoration of practical objects until the Roman period, despite some works such as the Gundestrup cauldron from the European Iron Age and the Bronze Age Trundholm sun chariot.

The oldest European cave art dates to 40,800 years ago and can be found in the El Castillo Cave in Spain. Other cave painting sites include Lascaux, Cave of Altamira, Grotte de Cussac, Pech Merle, Cave of Niaux, Chauvet Cave, Font-de-Gaume, Creswell Crags, Nottinghamshire, England, (Cave etchings and bas-reliefs discovered in 2003), Coliboaia cave from Romania (considered the oldest cave painting in central Europe) and Magura, Belogradchik, Bulgaria. Rock painting was also performed on cliff faces, but fewer of those have survived because of erosion. One well-known example is the rock paintings of Astuvansalmi in the Saimaa area of Finland. When Marcelino Sanz de Sautuola first encountered the Magdalenian paintings of the Altamira cave, Cantabria, Spain, in 1879, the academics of the time considered them hoaxes. Recent reappraisals and numerous additional discoveries have since demonstrated their authenticity, while also stimulating interest in the artistry of Upper Palaeolithic peoples. Cave paintings, undertaken with only the most rudimentary tools, can also furnish valuable insight into the culture and beliefs of that era.

The Rock art of the Iberian Mediterranean Basin represents a very different style, with the human figure the main focus, often seen in large groups, with battles, dancing, and hunting all represented, as well as other activities and details such as clothing. The figures are generally depicted rather sketchily in thin paint, with the relationships between the groups of humans and animals more carefully rendered than individual figures. Other, less numerous groups of rock art, many engraved rather than painted, show similar characteristics. The Iberian examples are believed to date from a long period, perhaps covering the Upper Paleolithic, Mesolithic, and early Neolithic.

Prehistoric Celtic art dates to much of Iron Age Europe and survives mainly as high-status metalwork skillfully decorated with complex, elegant, and mostly abstract designs, often featuring curving and spiral forms. There are human heads and some fully represented animals, but full-length human figures at any size are so rare that their absence may represent a religious taboo. As the Romans conquered Celtic territories, it almost entirely vanished. Still, the style continued in limited use in the British Isles, and with the coming of Christianity, it was revived there in the Insular style of the Early Middle Ages.

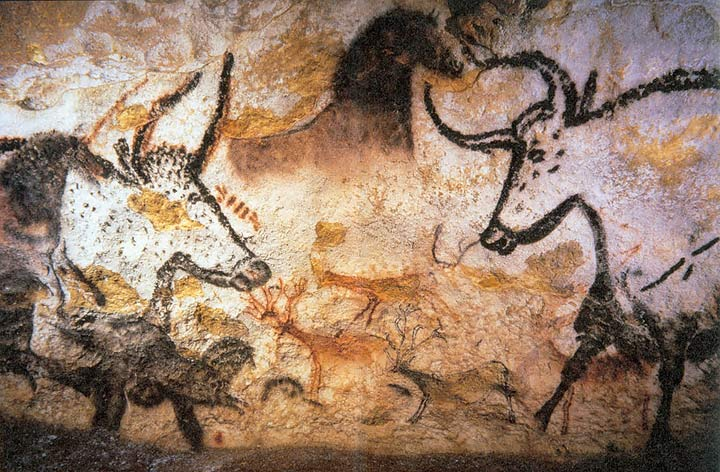
Cave paintings from Lascaux caves (Montignac, Dordogne, France)

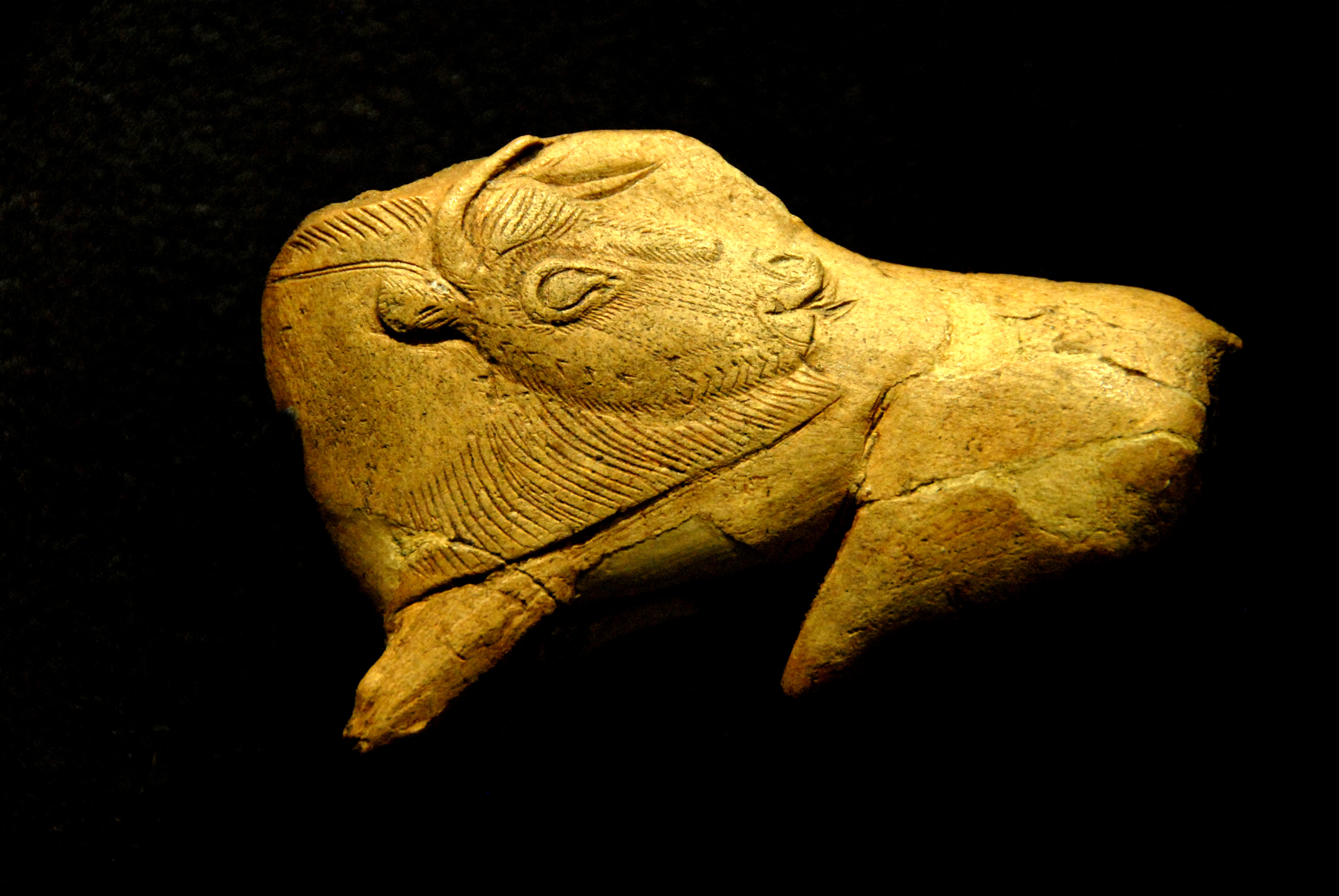
Bison Licking Insect Bite; 15,000–13,000 BC; antler; National Museum of Prehistory (Les Eyzies-de-Tayac-Sireuil, France)

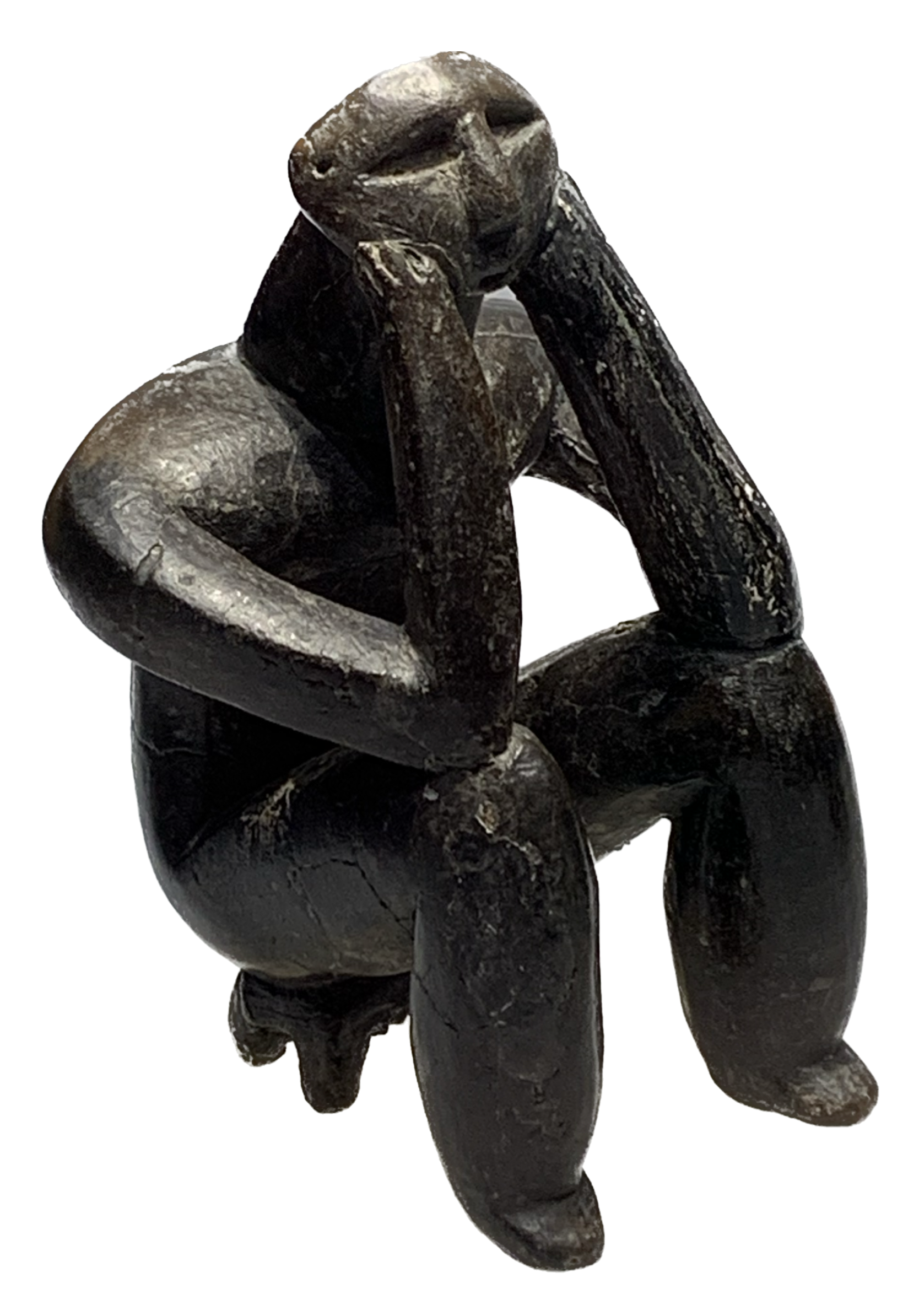
The Thinker of Cernavoda; by Hamangia culture from Romania; c. 5000 BC; terracotta; height: 11.5 cm (4 1/2 in.); National Museum of Romanian History (Bucharest)

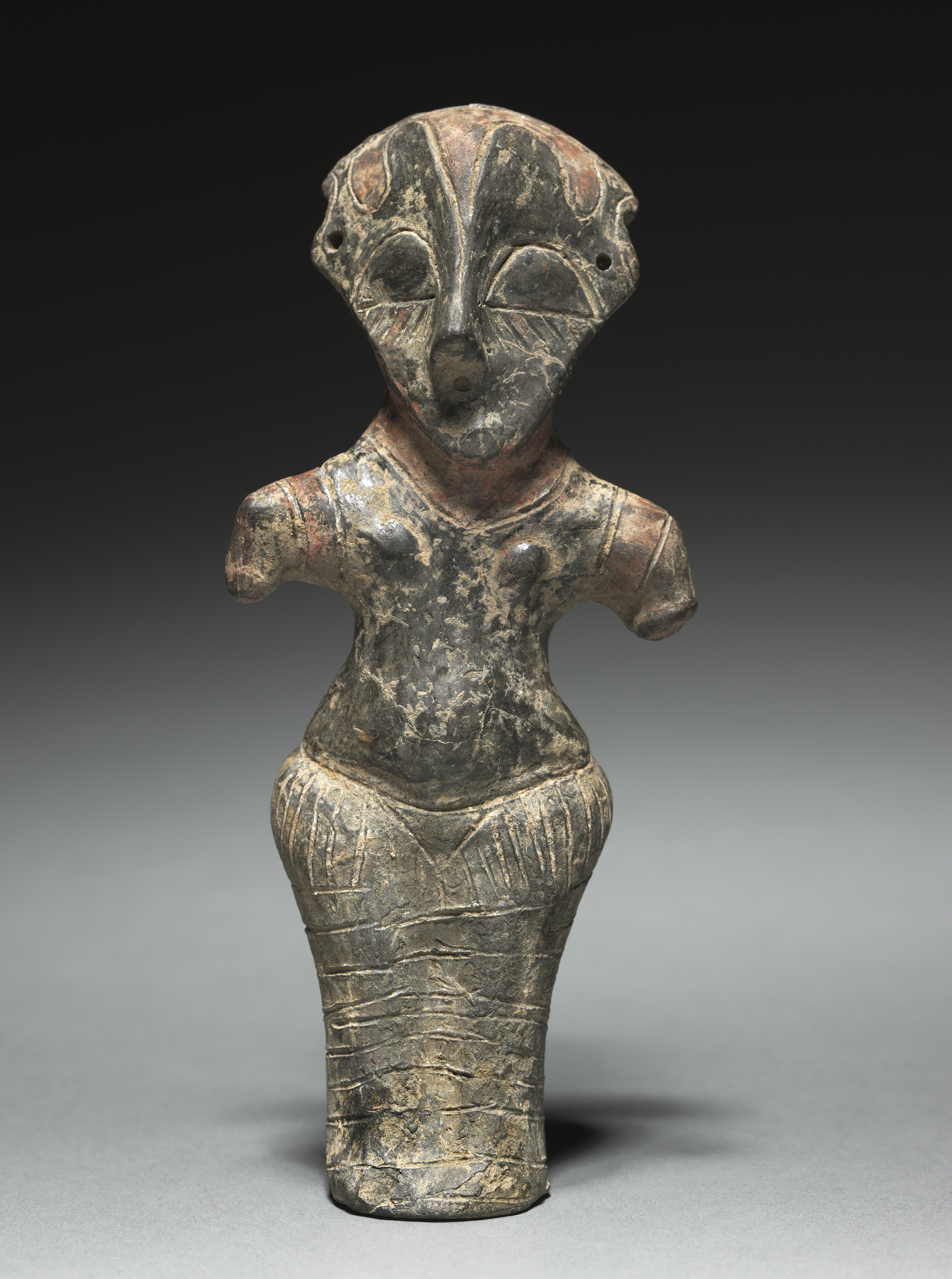
Female figure; by Vinča culture from Serbia; 4500-3500 BC; fired clay with paint; overall: 16.1 cm; Cleveland Museum of Art (Ohio, US)

== Ancient ==
=== Minoan ===
The Minoan civilization of Crete is regarded as the oldest civilization in Europe. Minoan art is marked by imaginative images and exceptional artistry. Sinclair Hood described an "essential quality of the finest Minoan art, the ability to create an atmosphere of movement and life although following a set of highly formal conventions". It forms part of the wider grouping of Aegean art, and in later periods came for a time to have a dominant influence over Cycladic art. Wood and textiles have decomposed, so most surviving examples of Minoan art are pottery, intricately carved Minoan seals, palace frescos (which include landscapes), small sculptures in various materials, jewellery, and metalwork.

The relationship of Minoan art to that of other contemporary cultures and later Ancient Greek art has been much discussed. It clearly dominated Mycenaean art and Cycladic art of the same periods, even after the Mycenaeans occupied Crete, but only some aspects of the tradition survived the Greek Dark Ages after the collapse of Mycenaean Greece.

Minoan art encompasses a variety of subject matter, much of it appearing across different media, although only some pottery styles include figurative scenes. Bull-leaping appears in painting and several types of sculpture, and is thought to have had a religious significance; bull's heads are also a popular subject in terracotta and other sculptural materials. There are no figures that appear to be portraits of individuals, or are clearly royal, and the identities of religious figures are often tentative, with scholars uncertain whether they are deities, clergy, or devotees. Equally, whether painted rooms were "shrines" or secular is far from clear; one room in Akrotiri has been argued to be a bedroom, with remains of a bed, or a shrine.

Animals, including an unusual variety of marine fauna, are often depicted; the "Marine Style" is a type of painted palace pottery from MM III and LM IA that paints sea creatures including octopus spreading all over the vessel, and probably originated from similar frescoed scenes; sometimes these appear in other media. Scenes of hunting and warfare, and of horses and riders, are mostly found in later periods, in works perhaps made by Cretans for a Mycenaean market or for Mycenaean overlords of Crete.

While Minoan figures, whether human or animal, have a great sense of life and movement, they are often not very accurate, and the species is sometimes impossible to identify; by comparison with Ancient Egyptian art they are often more vivid, but less naturalistic. In comparison with the art of other ancient cultures there is a high proportion of female figures. However, the idea that Minoans had only goddesses and no gods is now discounted. Most human figures are in profile or in a version of the Egyptian convention with the head and legs in profile, and the torso seen frontally. Still, the Minoan figures exaggerate features such as slim male waists and large female breasts.

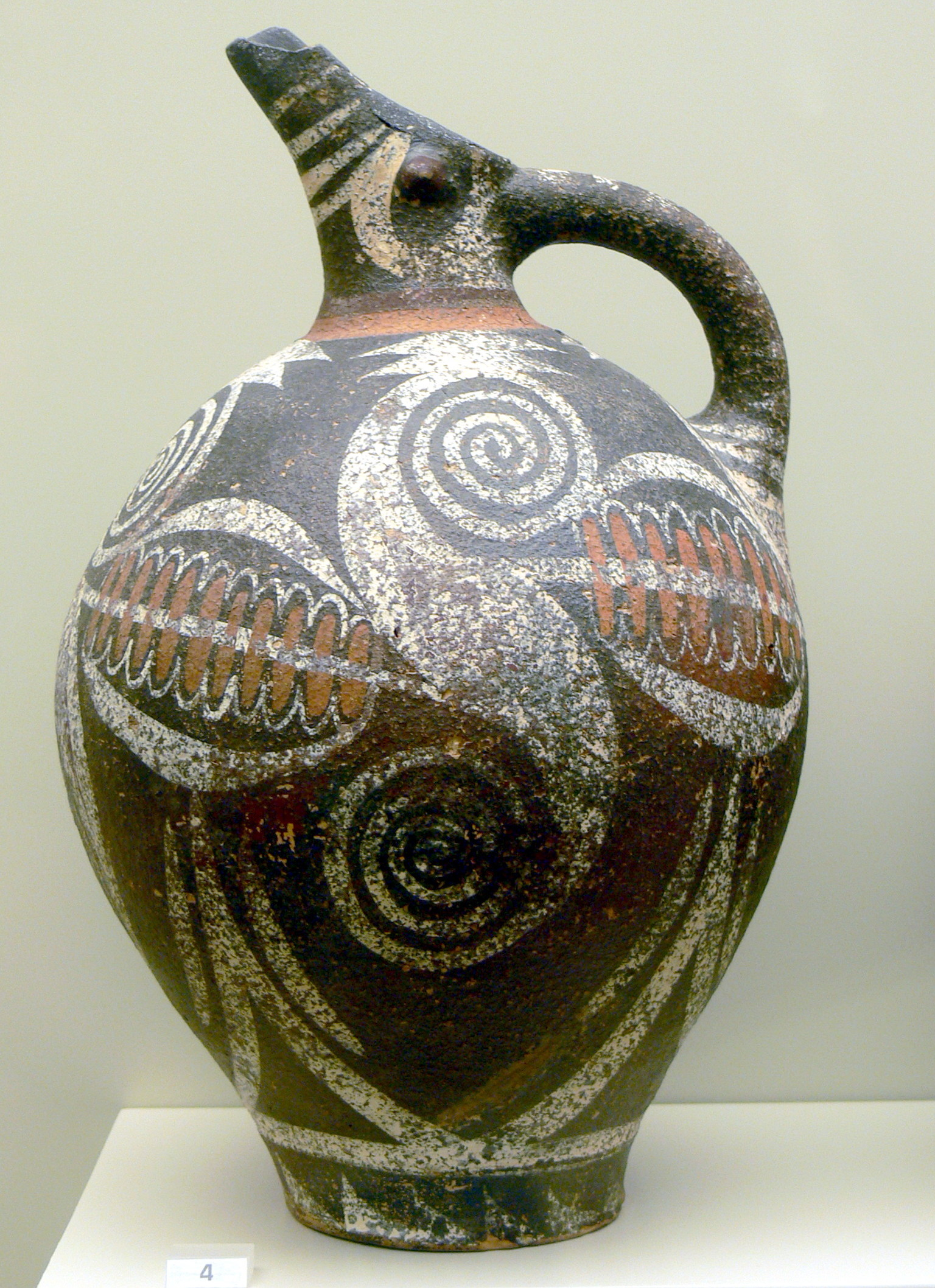
Kamares ware beaked jug; 1850-1675 BC; ceramic; height: 27 cm; from Phaistos (Crete, Greece); Heraklion Archaeological Museum (Greece)

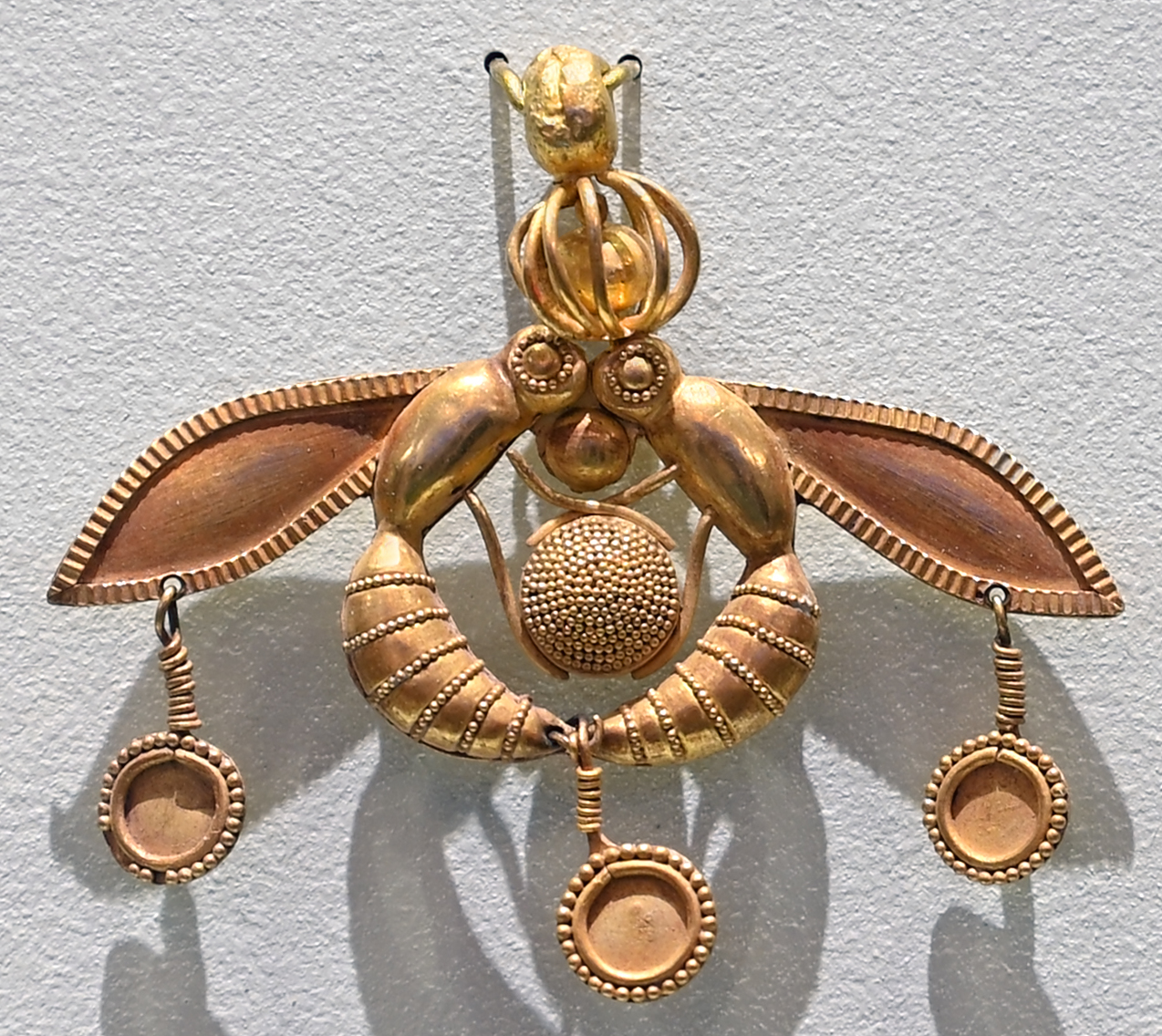
The Malia Pendant; 1800-1700 BC; gold; height: 4.6 cm, width: 4.9 cm; Heraklion Archaeological Museum

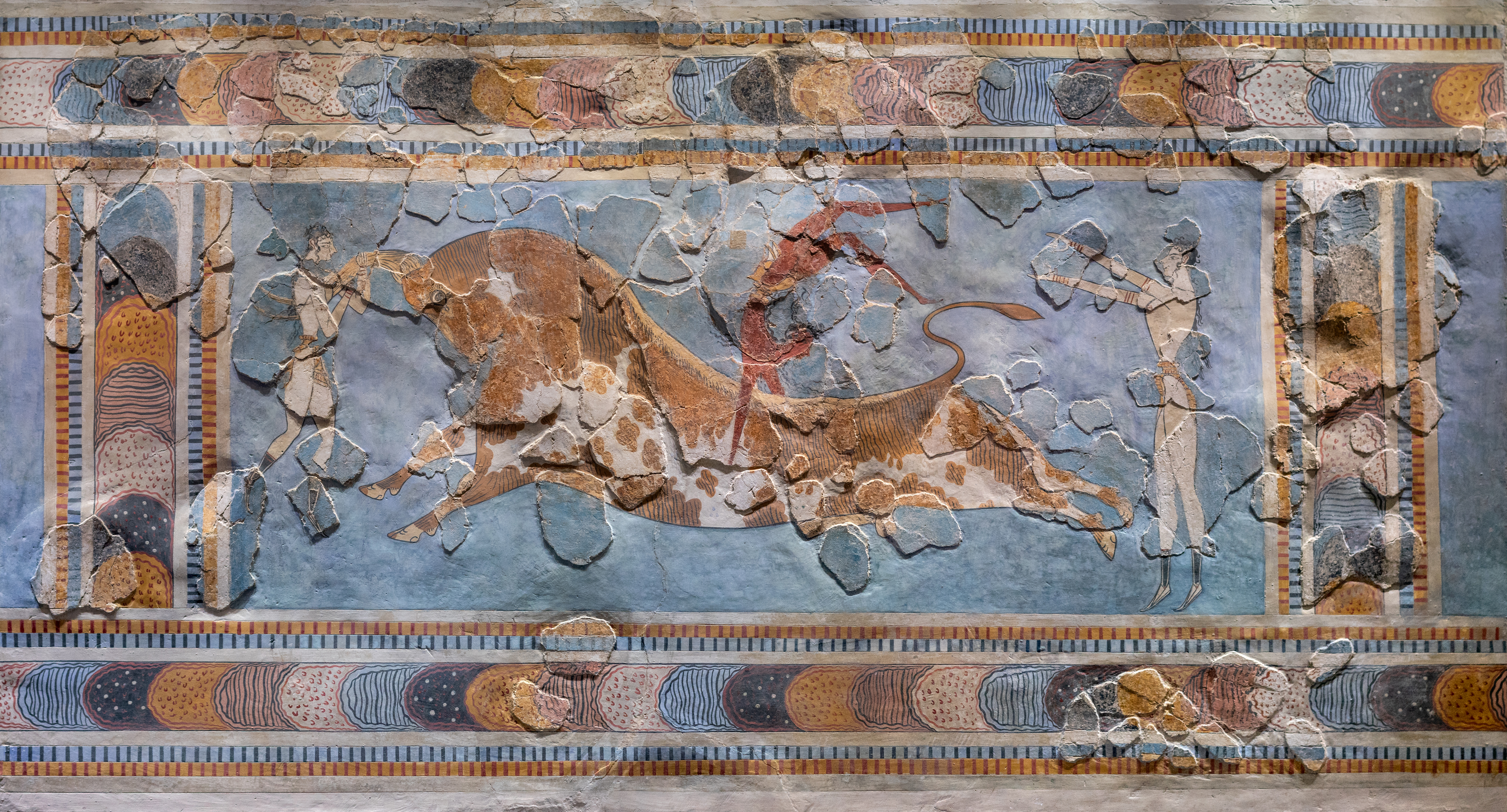
The fresco named the Bull-Leaping Fresco; 1675-1460 BC; lime plaster; height: 0.8 m, width: 1 m; from the palace at Knossos (Crete); Heraklion Archaeological Museum

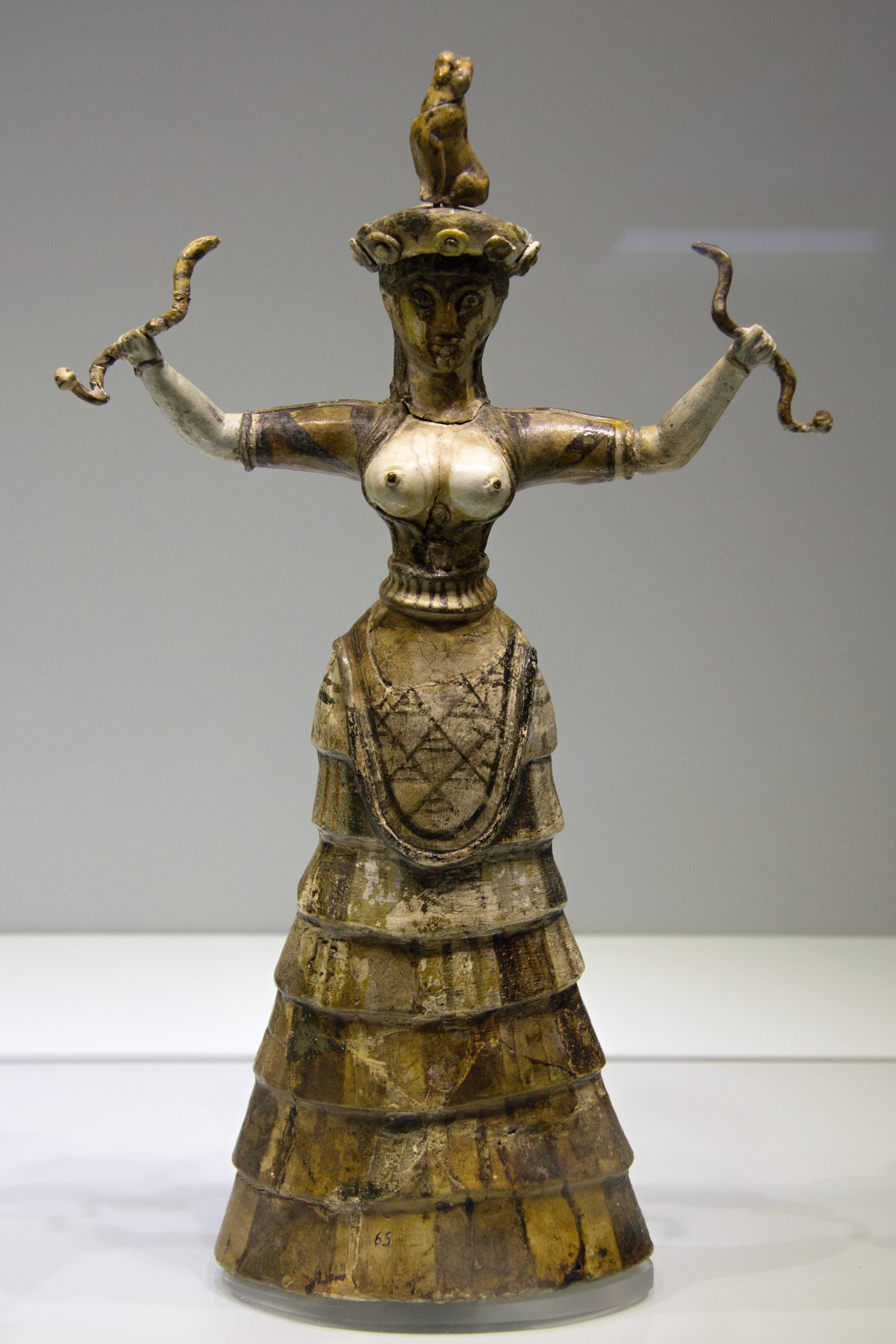
"Snake Goddess" figurine; 1460-1410 BC (from the Minoan Neo-palatial Period); faience; height: 29.5 cm; from the Temple Repository at Knossos; Heraklion Archaeological Museum

=== Classical Greek and Hellenistic ===
Ancient Greece had great painters, great sculptors, and great architects. The Parthenon is an example of their architecture that has endured into modern times. Greek marble sculpture is often described as the highest form of Classical art. Painting on pottery of Ancient Greece and ceramics offers a particularly informative glimpse into how society in Ancient Greece functioned. Black-figure vase painting and Red-figure vase painting provide many surviving examples of what Greek painting was like. Some famous Greek wood panel painters mentioned in texts are Apelles, Zeuxis and Parrhasius. No examples of Ancient Greek panel painting survive, only written descriptions by their contemporaries or by later Romans. Zeuxis lived in 5–6 BC and was said to be the first to use sfumato. According to Pliny the Elder, the realism of his paintings was such that birds tried to eat the painted grapes. Apelles is described as the greatest painter of Antiquity for perfect technique in drawing, brilliant color, and modeling.

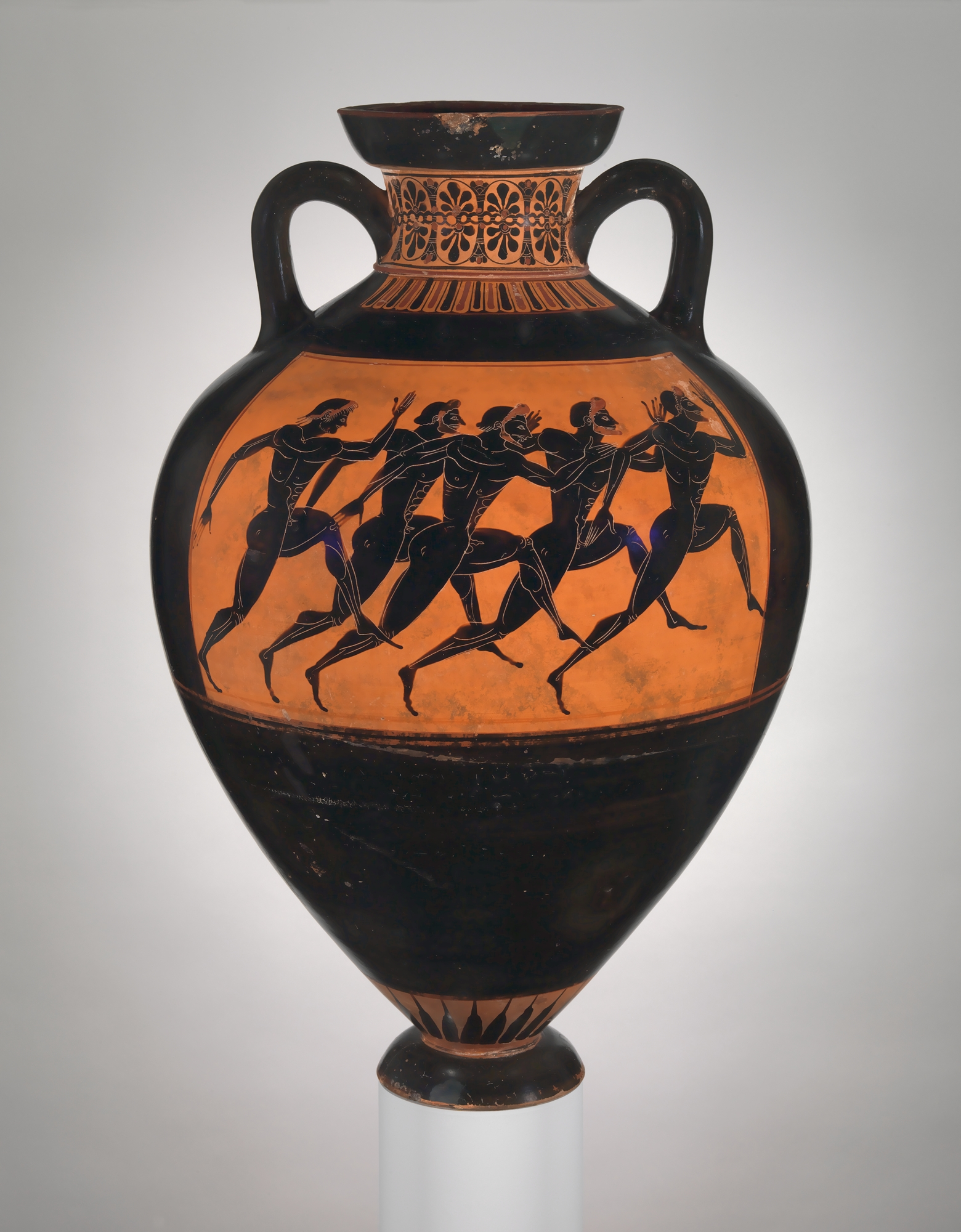
The Euphiletos Painter Panathenaic prize amphora; 530 BC; painted terracotta; height: 62.2 cm; Metropolitan Museum of Art (New York City)

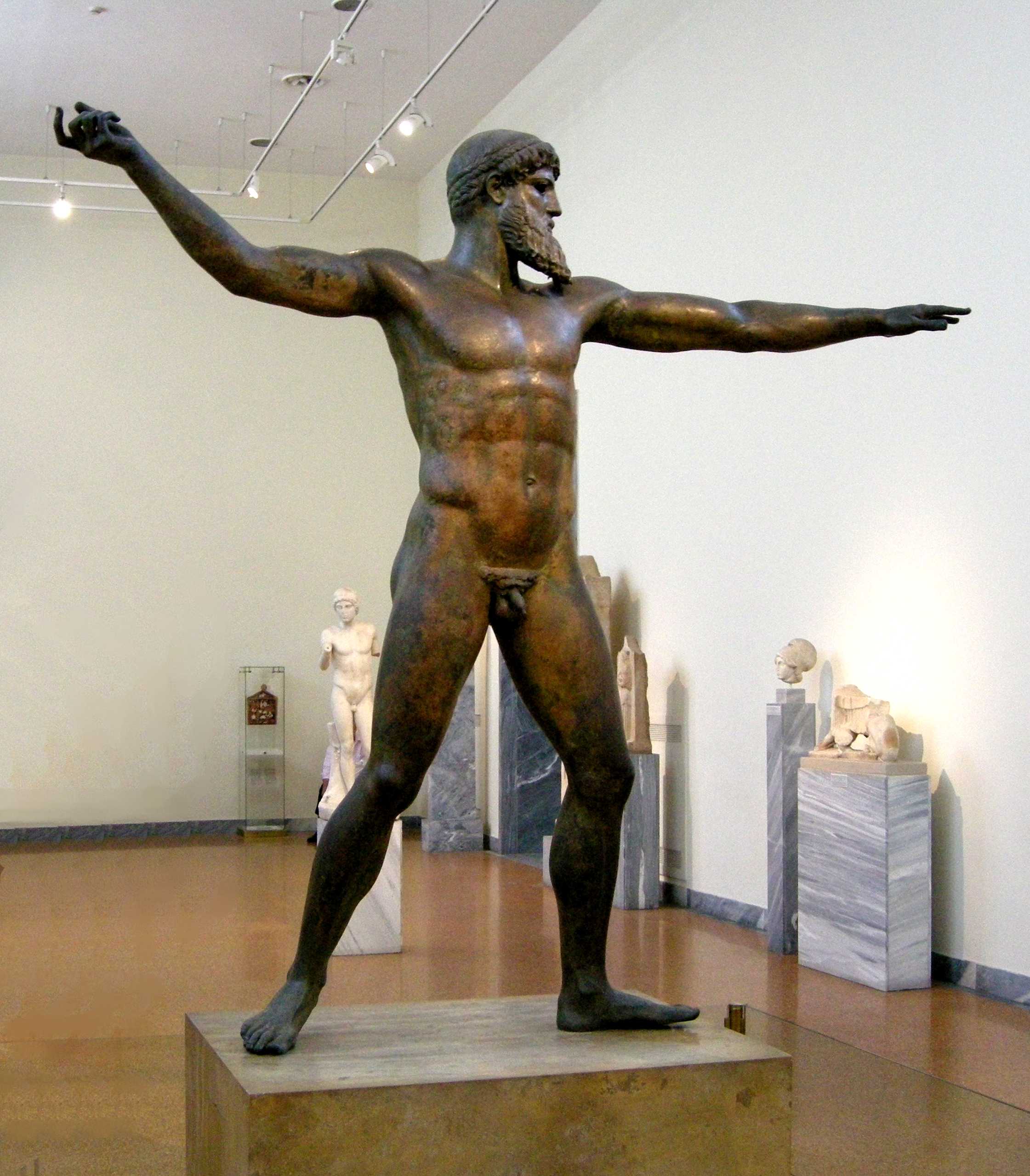
The Artemision Bronze; 460-450 BC; bronze; height: 2.1 m; National Archaeological Museum (Athens)

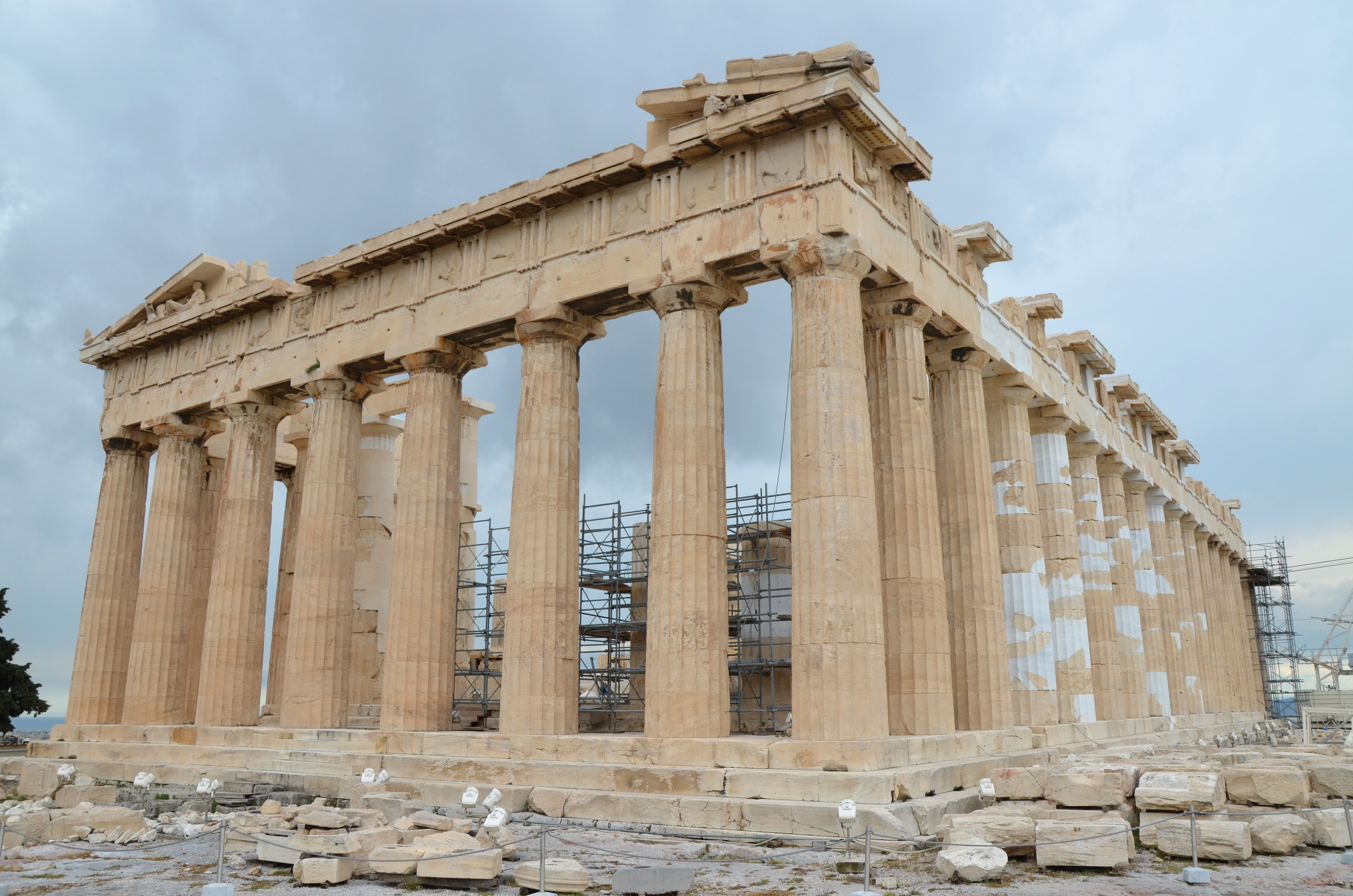
The Parthenon on the Athenian Acropolis, the most iconic Doric Greek temple built of marble and limestone between circa 460-406 BC, dedicated to the goddess Athena

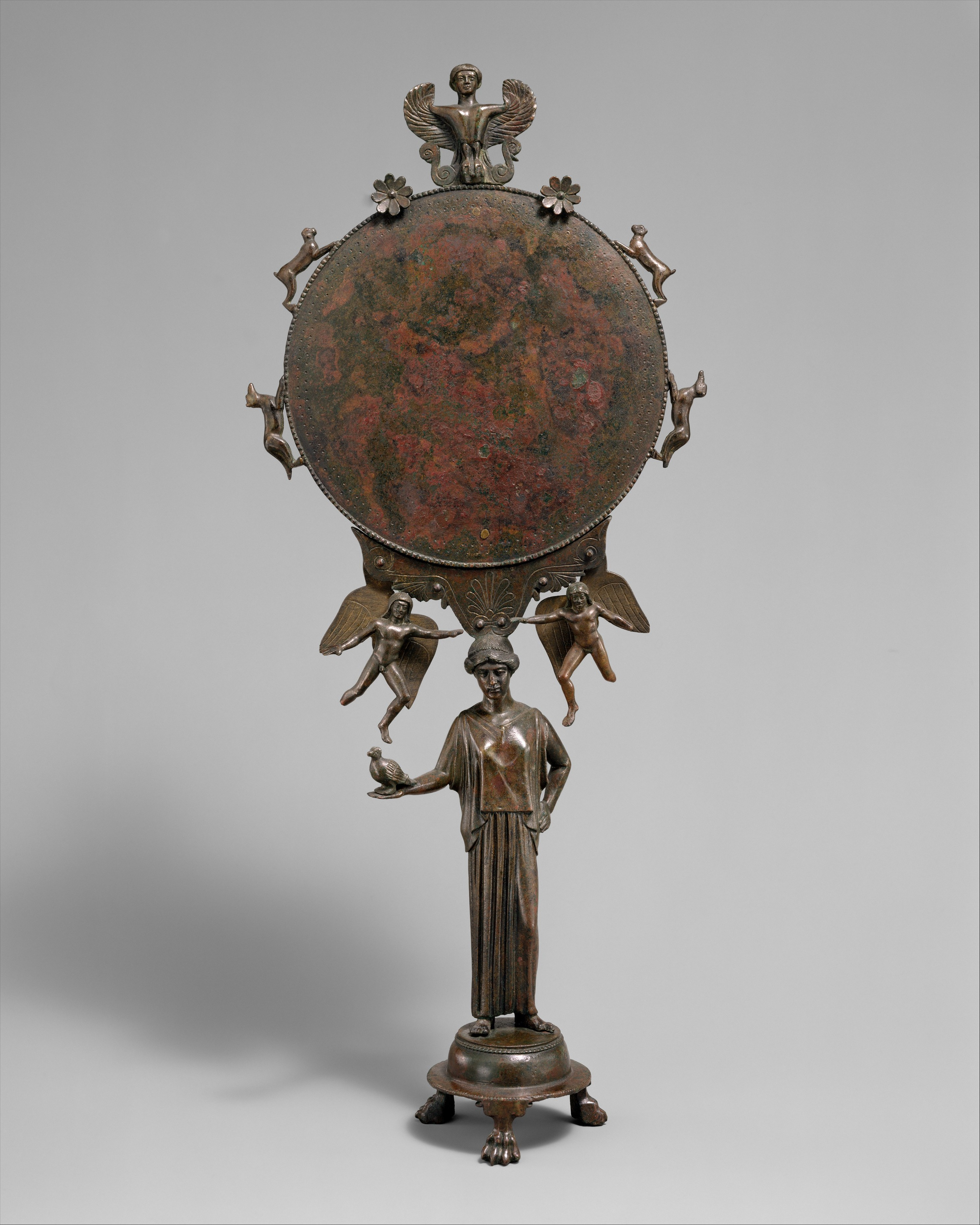
Mirror with a support in the form of a draped woman; mid-5th century BC; bronze; height: 40.41 cm; Metropolitan Museum of Art

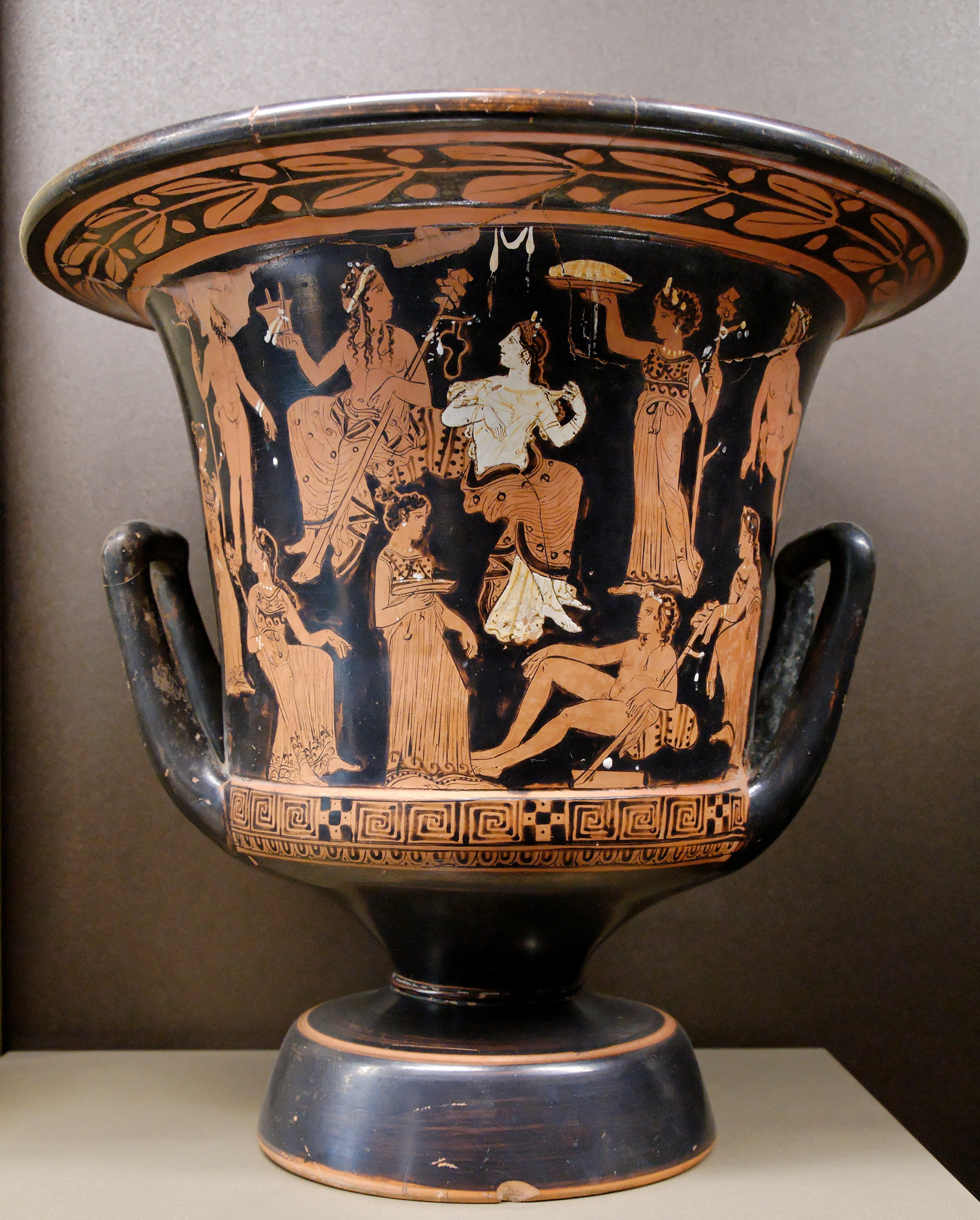
Calyx-krater; 400-375 BC; ceramic; height: 27.9 cm, diameter: 28.6 cm; from Thebes (Greece); Louvre

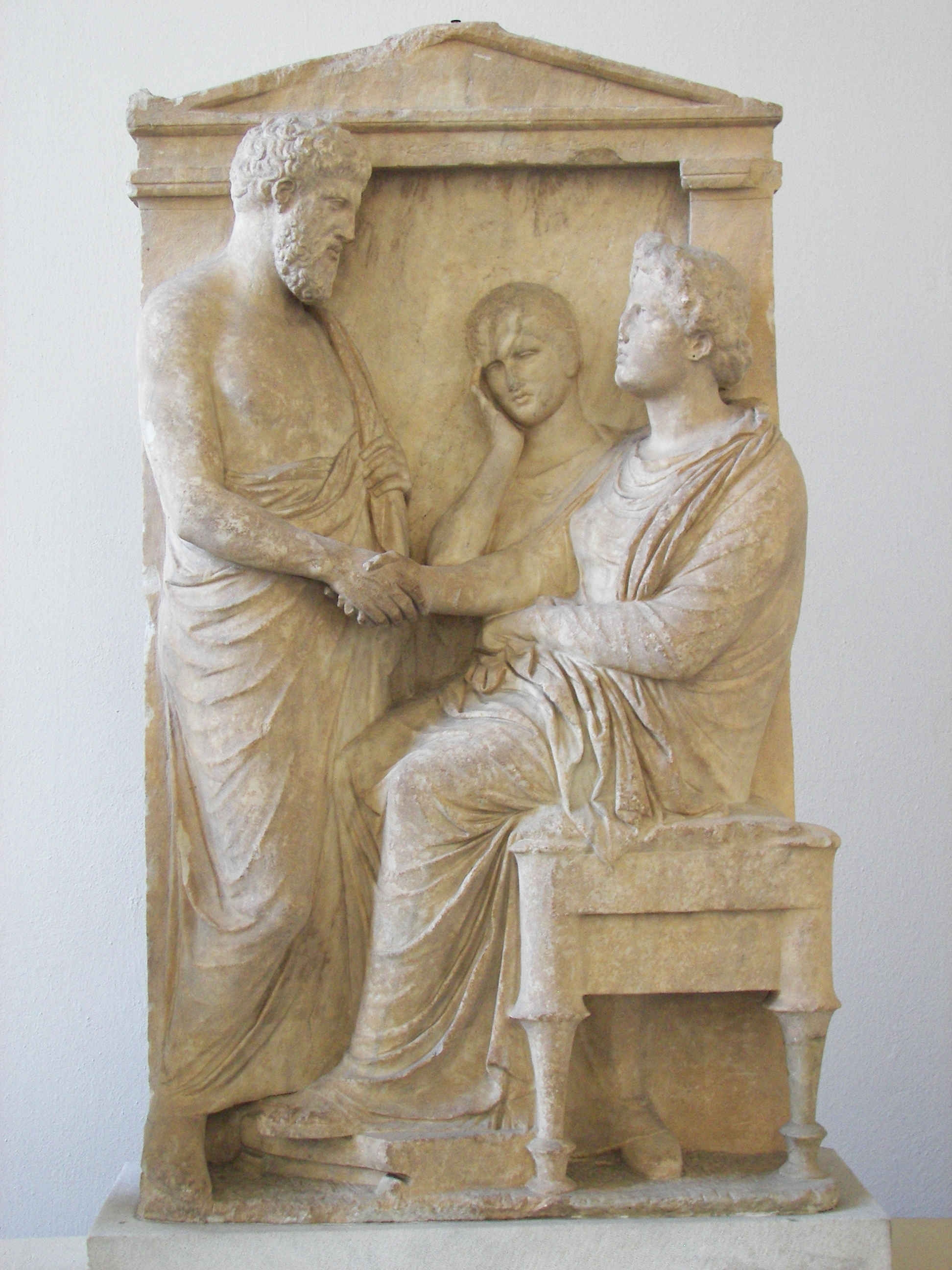
The Grave relief of Thraseas and Euandria; 375-350 BC; Pentelic marble; height: 160 cm, width: 91 cm; Pergamon Museum (Berlin)

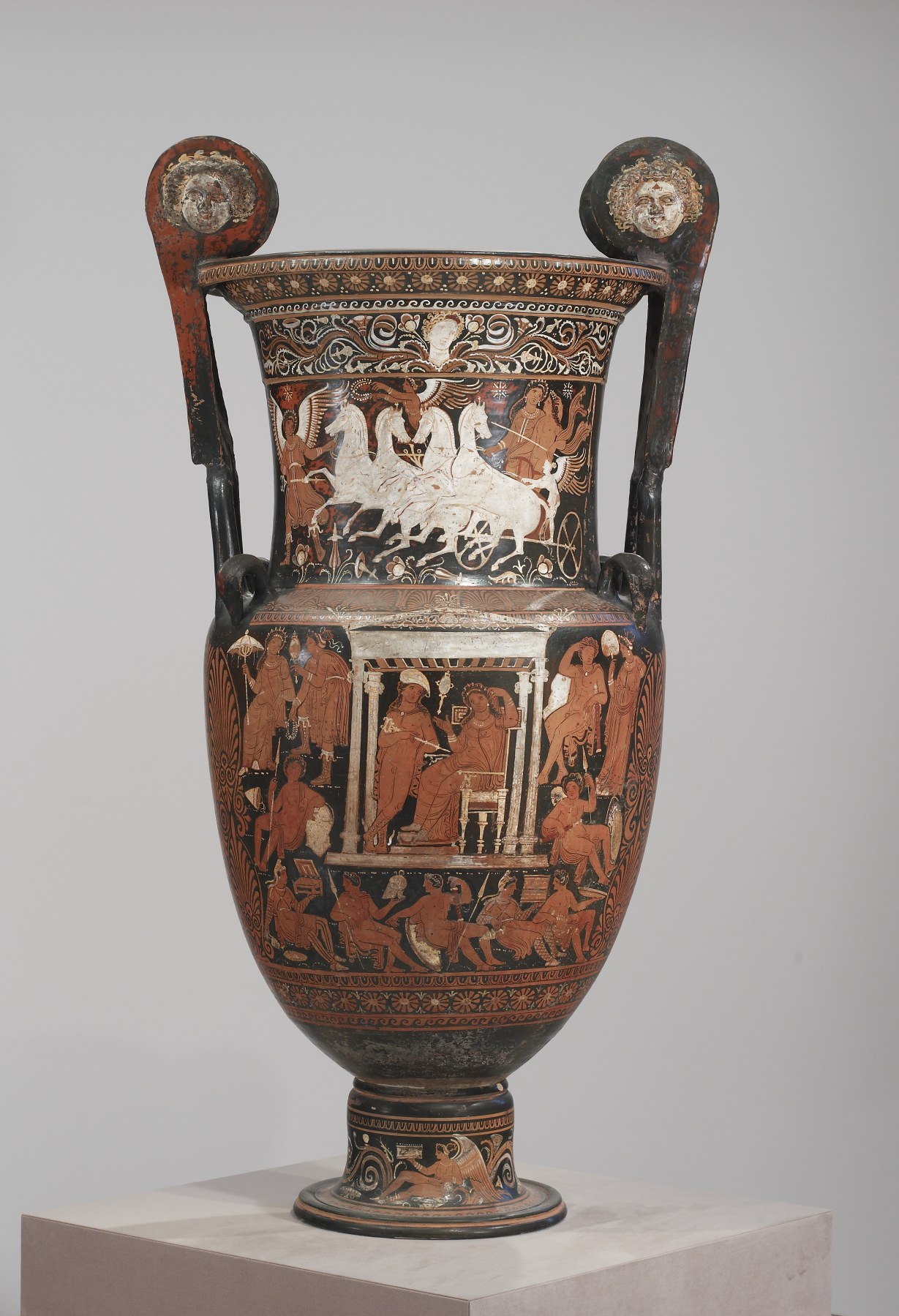
Volute krater; 320-310 BC; ceramic; height: 1.1 m; Walters Art Museum (Baltimore, US)

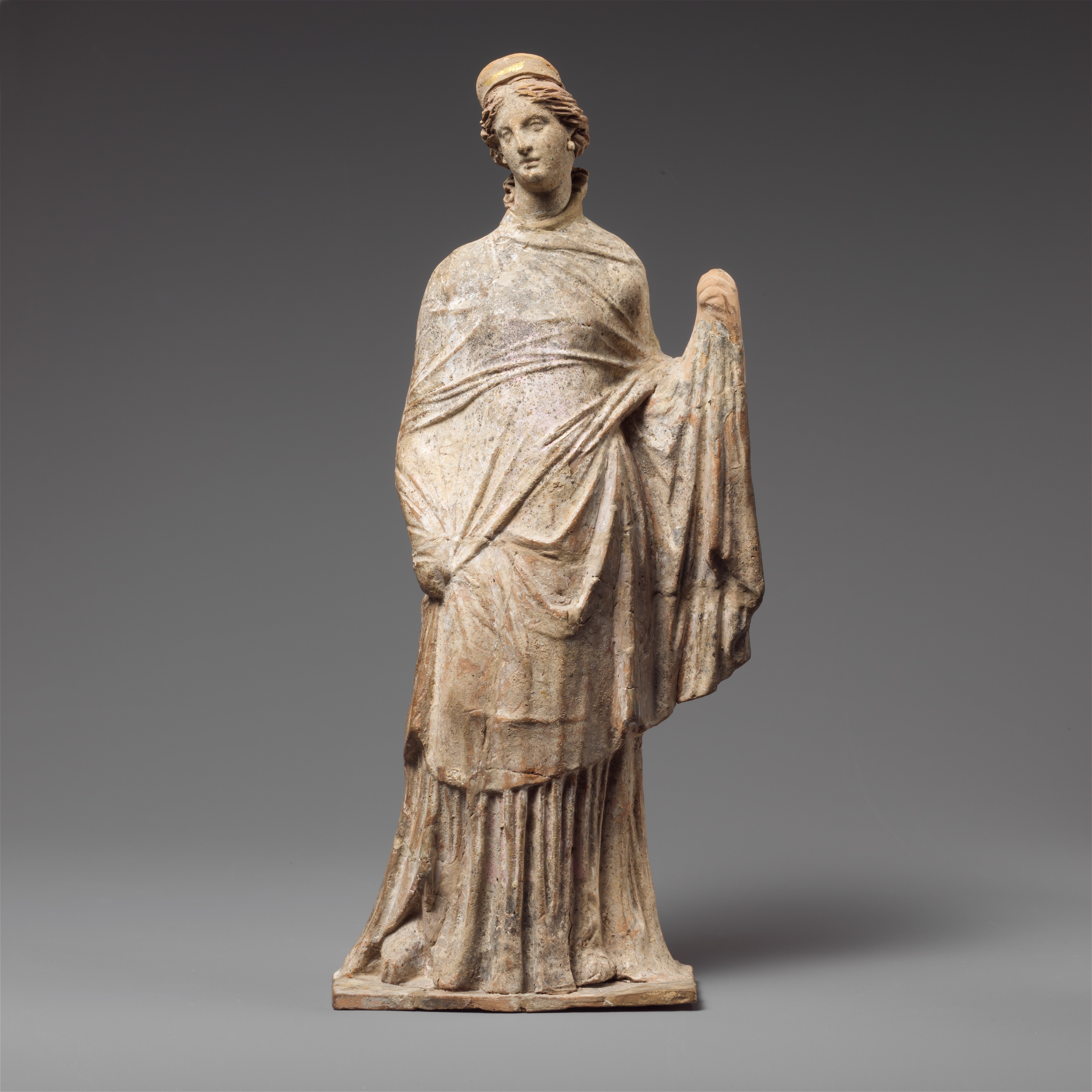
Statuette of a draped woman; 2nd century BC; terracotta; height: 29.2 cm; Metropolitan Museum of Art

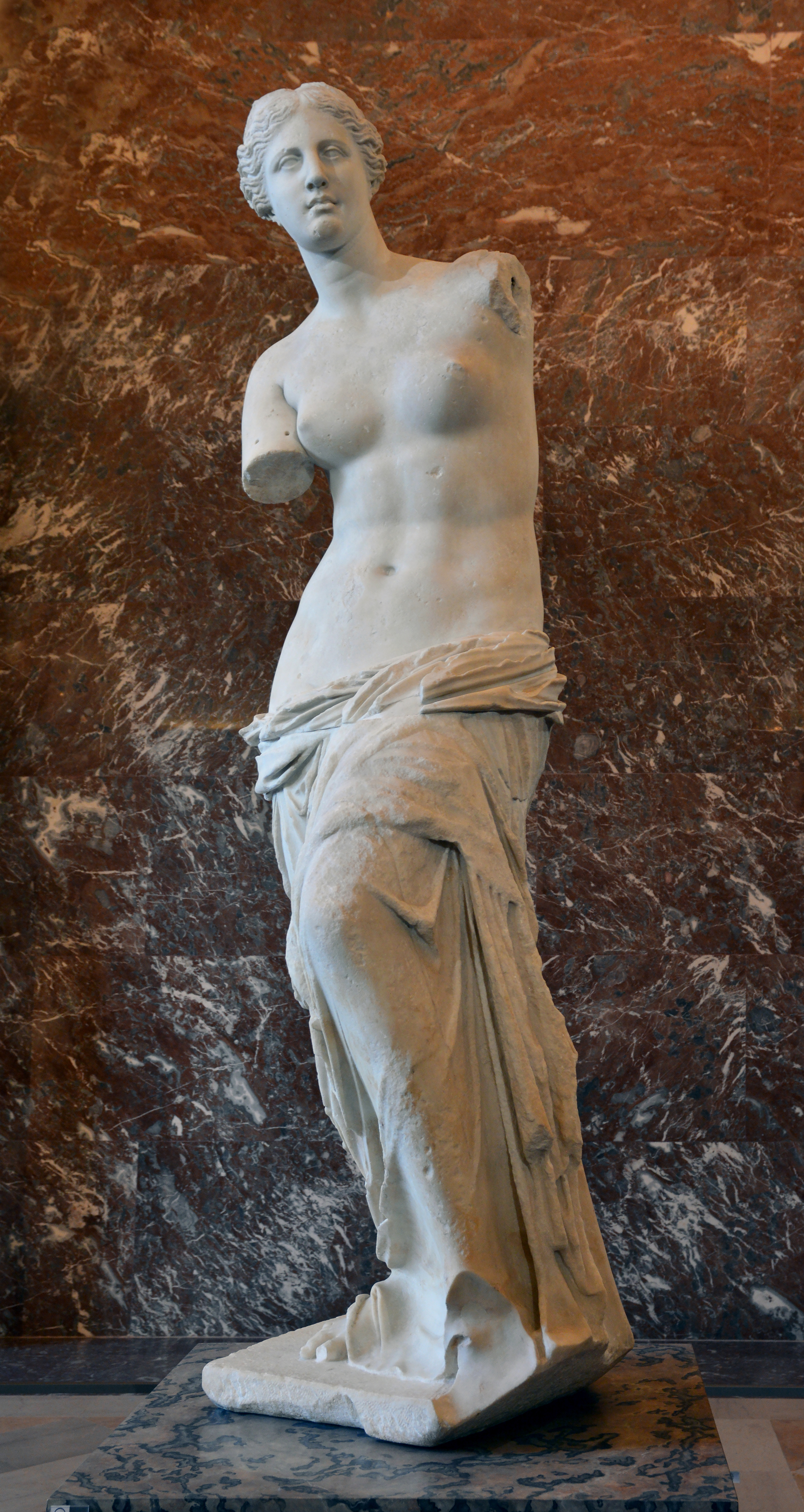
Venus de Milo; 130–100 BC; marble; height: 203 cm (80 in); Louvre

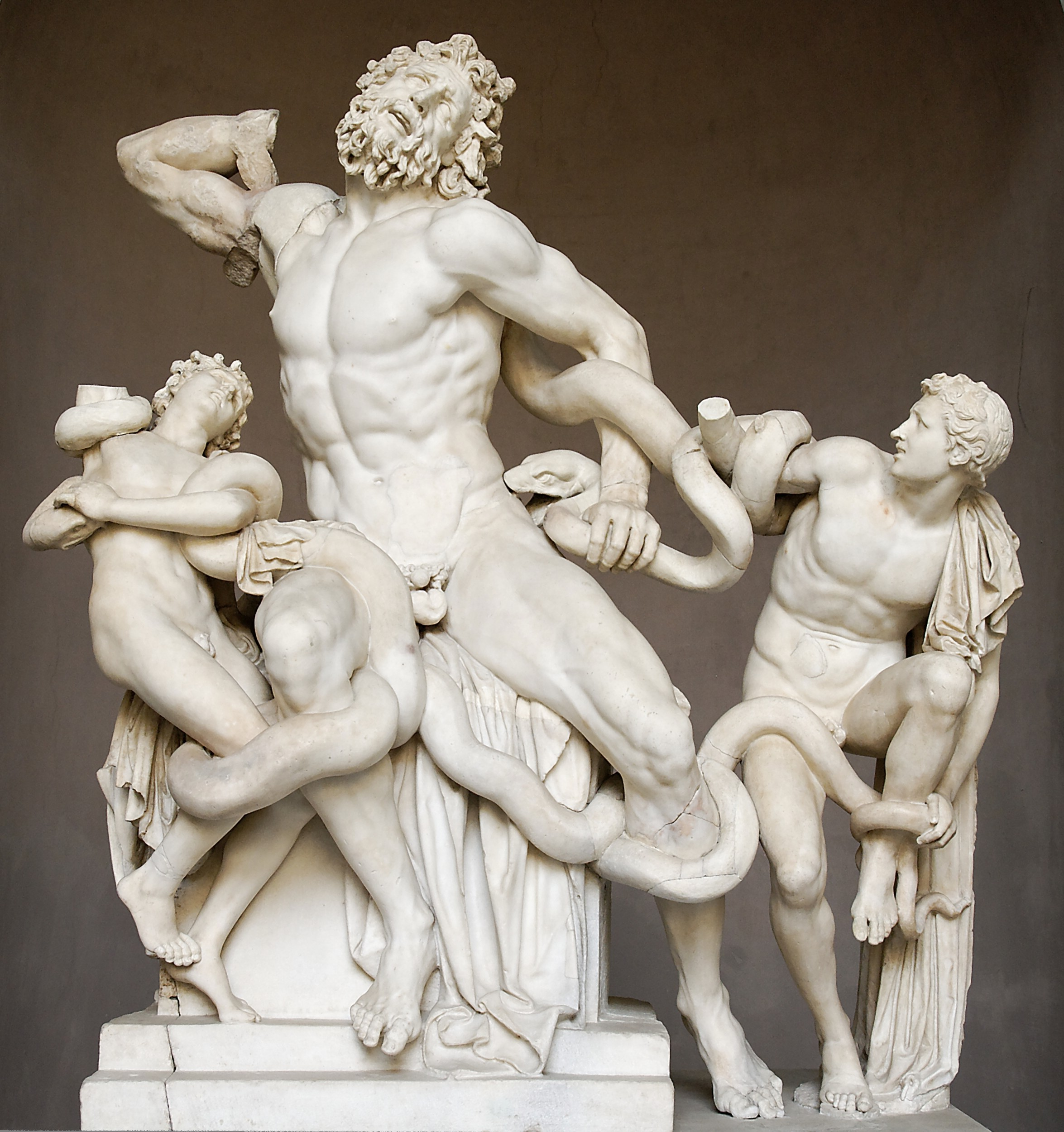
Laocoön and His Sons; early first century BC; marble; height: 2.4 m; Vatican Museums (Vatican City)

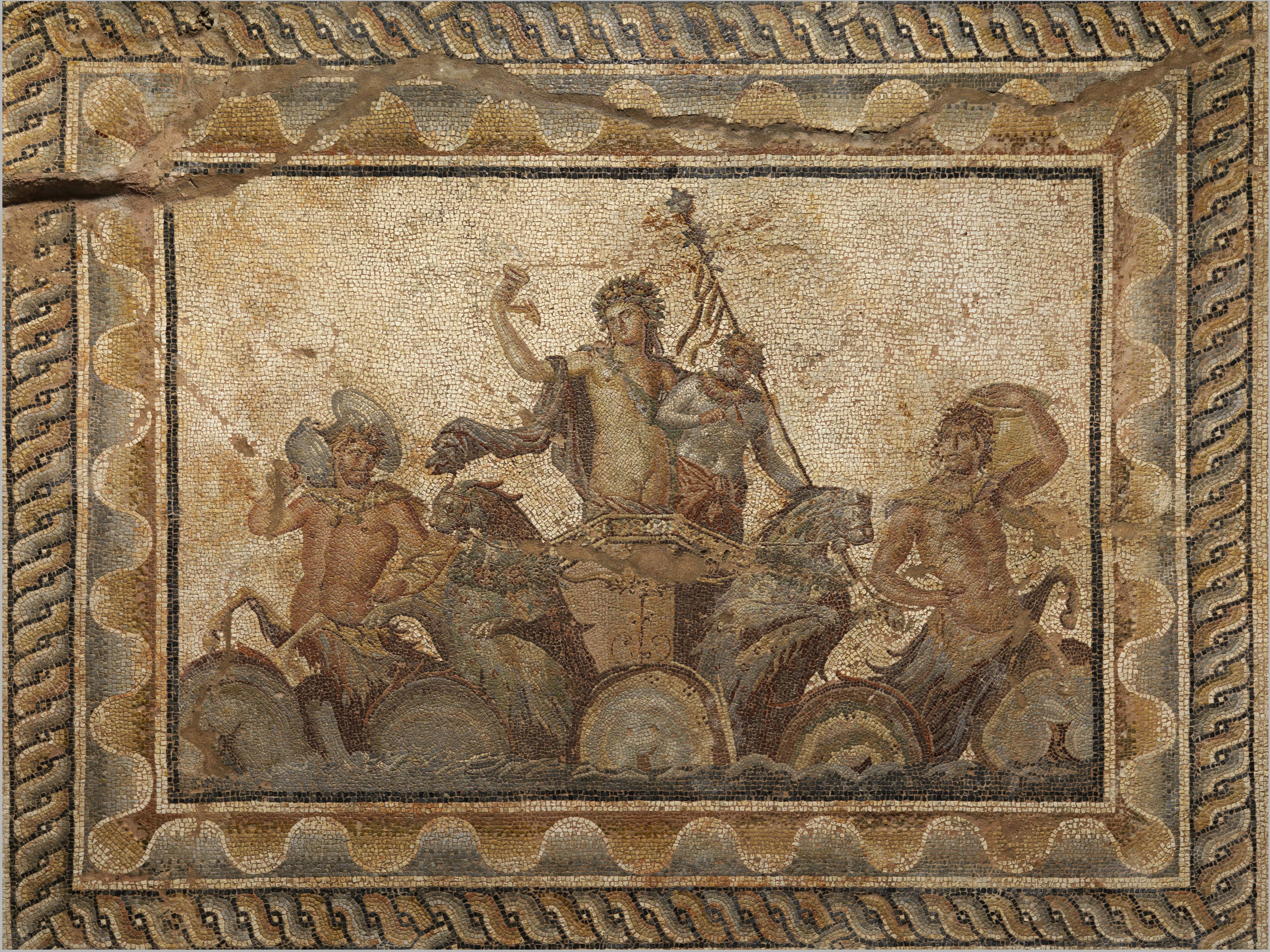
Mosaic which represents the Epiphany of Dionysus; 2nd century AD; from the Villa of Dionysus (Dion, Greece); Archeological Museum of Dion

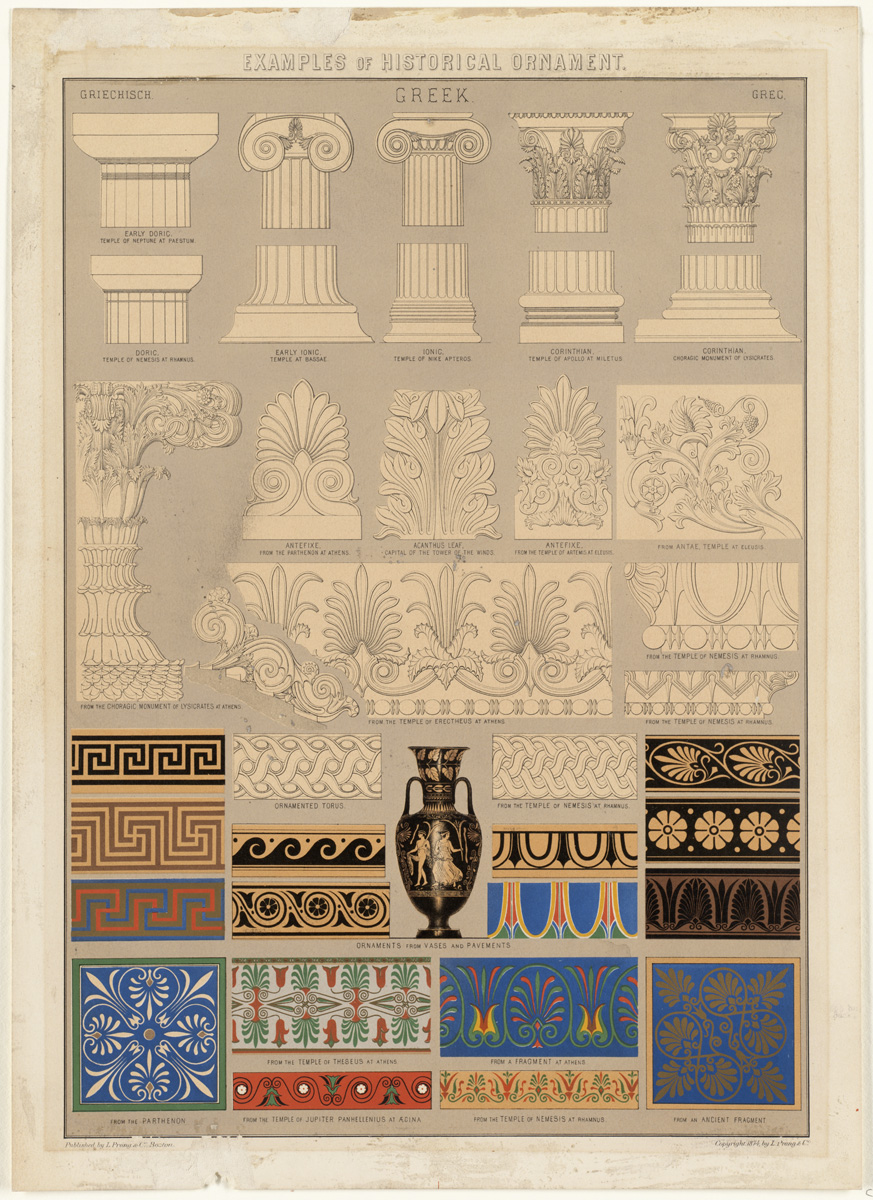
Illustrations of examples of ancient Greek ornaments and patterns, drawn in 1874

=== Roman ===
Roman art was influenced by Greece and can, in part, be seen as a descendant of ancient Greek painting and sculpture, but was also strongly influenced by the more local Etruscan art of Italy. Roman sculpture is primarily portraiture of the upper classes, as well as depictions of the gods. However, Roman painting does have important, unique characteristics. Among surviving Roman paintings are wall paintings, many from villas in Campania, in Southern Italy, especially at Pompeii and Herculaneum. Such painting can be grouped into four main "styles" or periods and may contain the first examples of trompe-l'œil, pseudo-perspective, and pure landscape.

Almost all of the surviving painted portraits from the Ancient world are a large number of coffin-portraits of bust form found in the Late Antique cemetery of Al-Fayum. They give an idea of the quality that the finest ancient work must have had. A very small number of miniatures from Late Antique illustrated books also survive, and a rather larger number of copies of them from the early medieval period. Early Christian art grew out of Roman popular, and later Imperial, art and adapted its iconography from these sources.

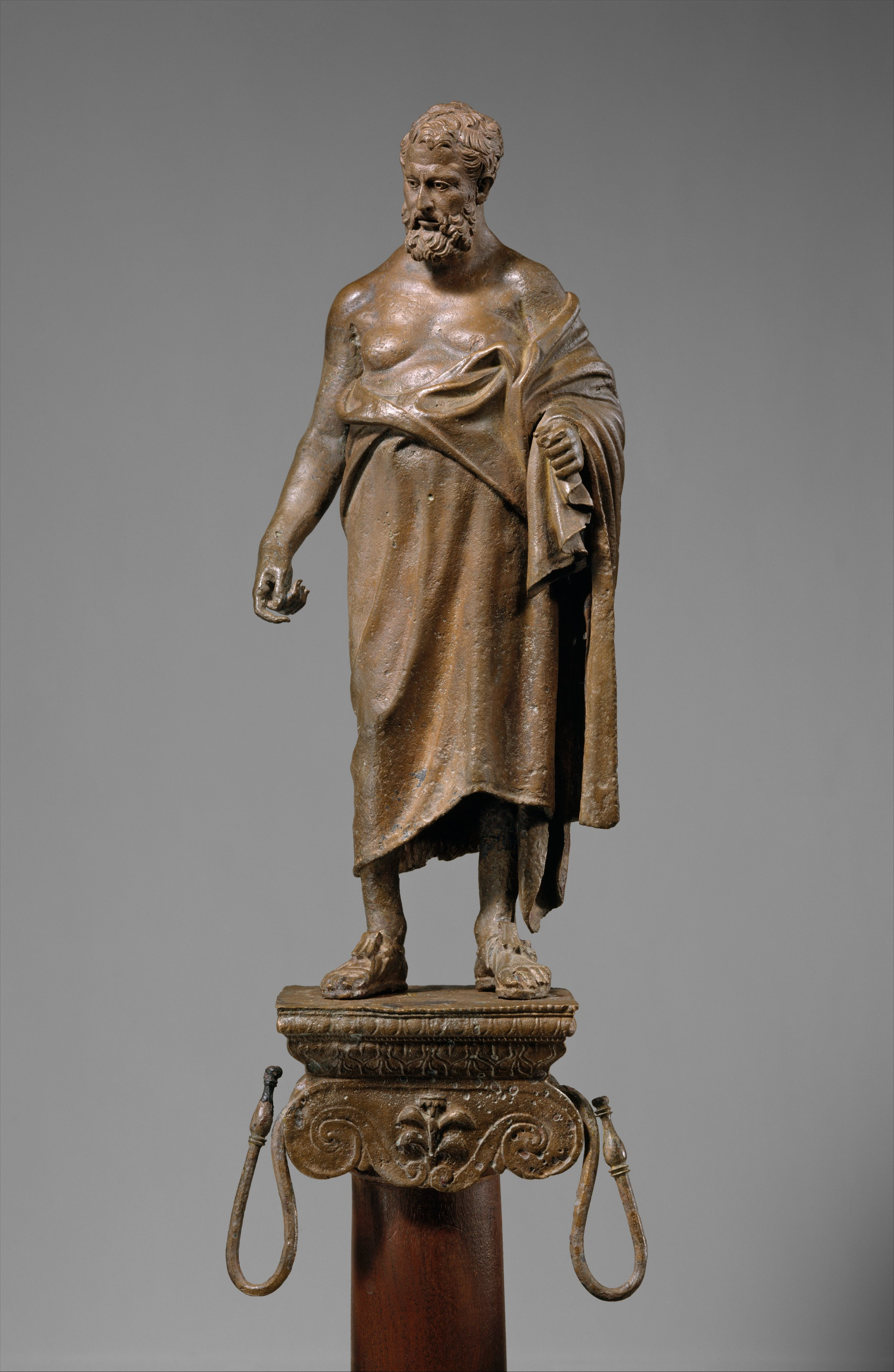
Bronze statuette of a philosopher on a lamp stand; late 1st century BC; bronze; overall: 27.3 cm; weight: 2.9 kg; Metropolitan Museum of Art (New York City)

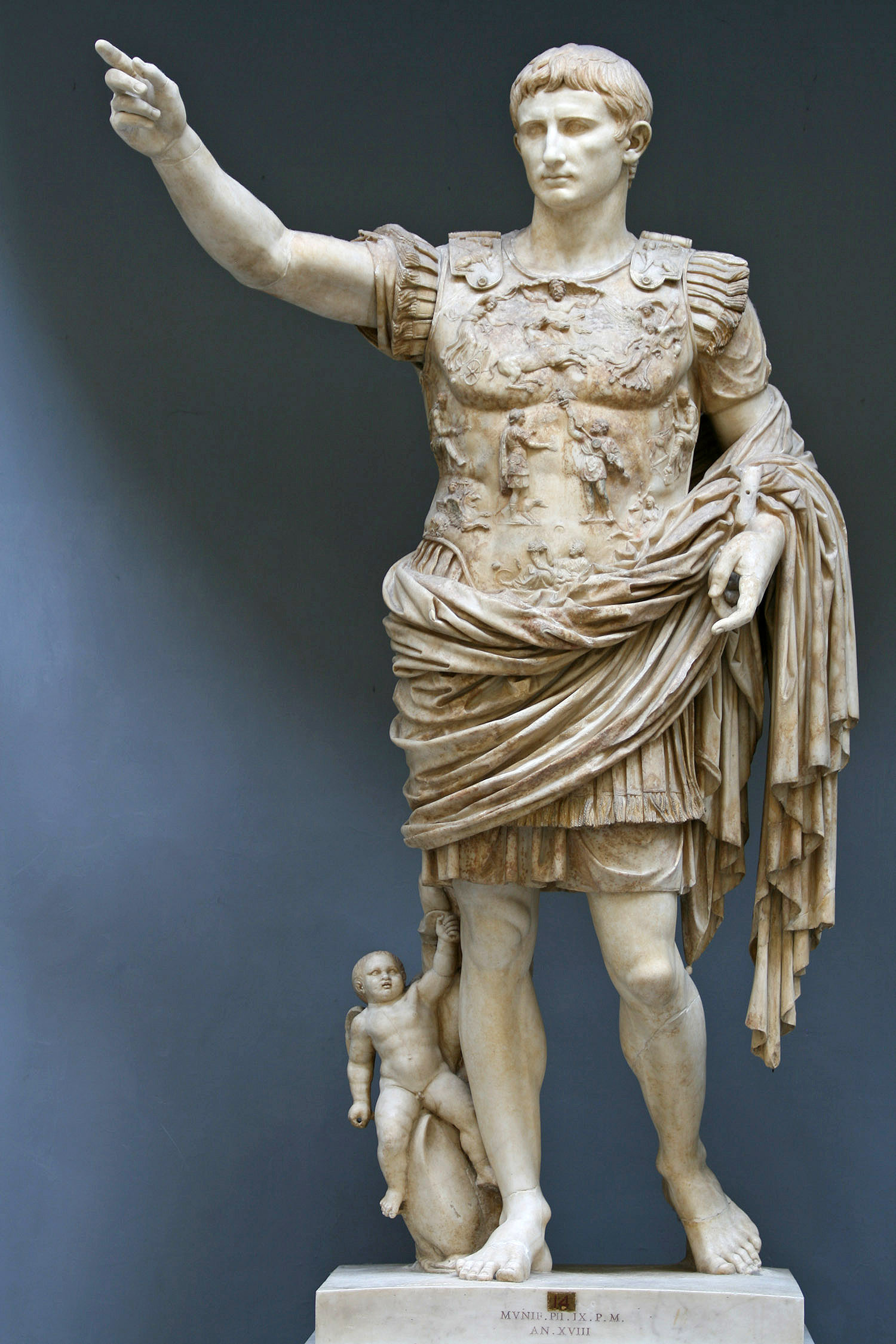
Augustus of Prima Porta; circa 20 BC; white marble; height: 2.06 m; Vatican Museums (Vatican City)

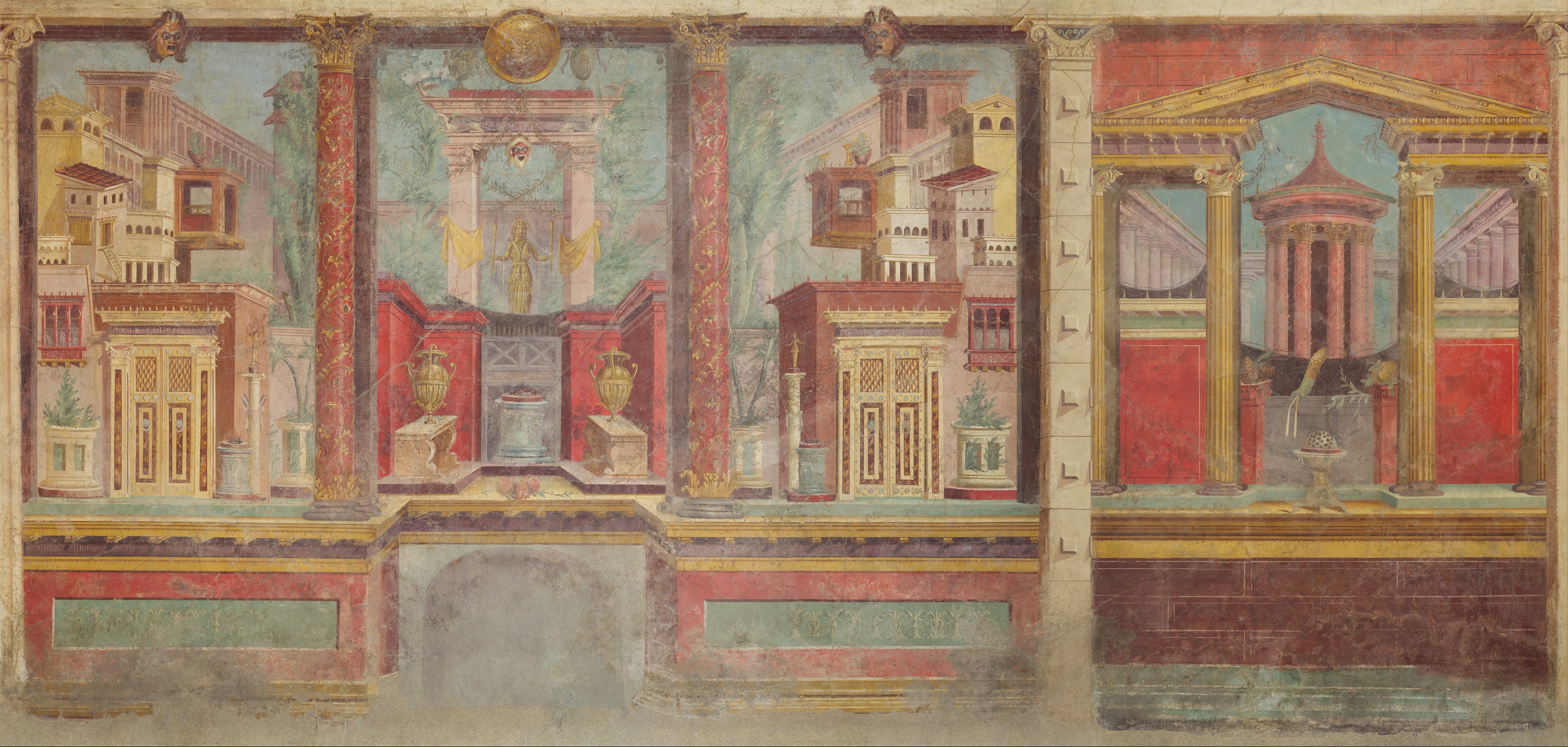
Restoration of a fresco from an Ancient villa bedroom; 50-40 BC; dimensions of the room: 265.4 x 334 x 583.9 cm; Metropolitan Museum of Art (New York City)

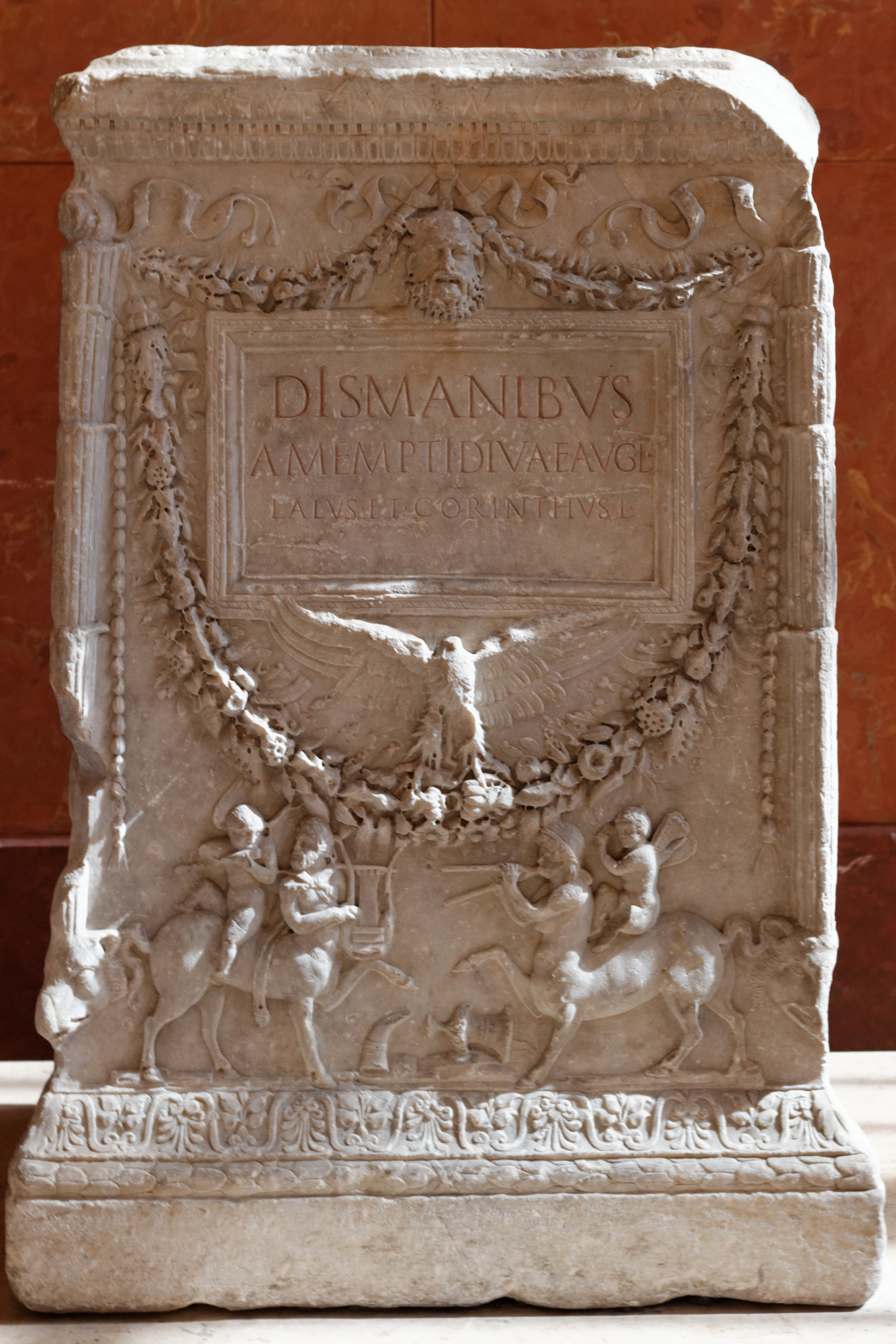
Altar with festoons; circa 50 AD; marble; height: 99.5 cm, width: 61.5 cm, depth: 47 cm; Louvre

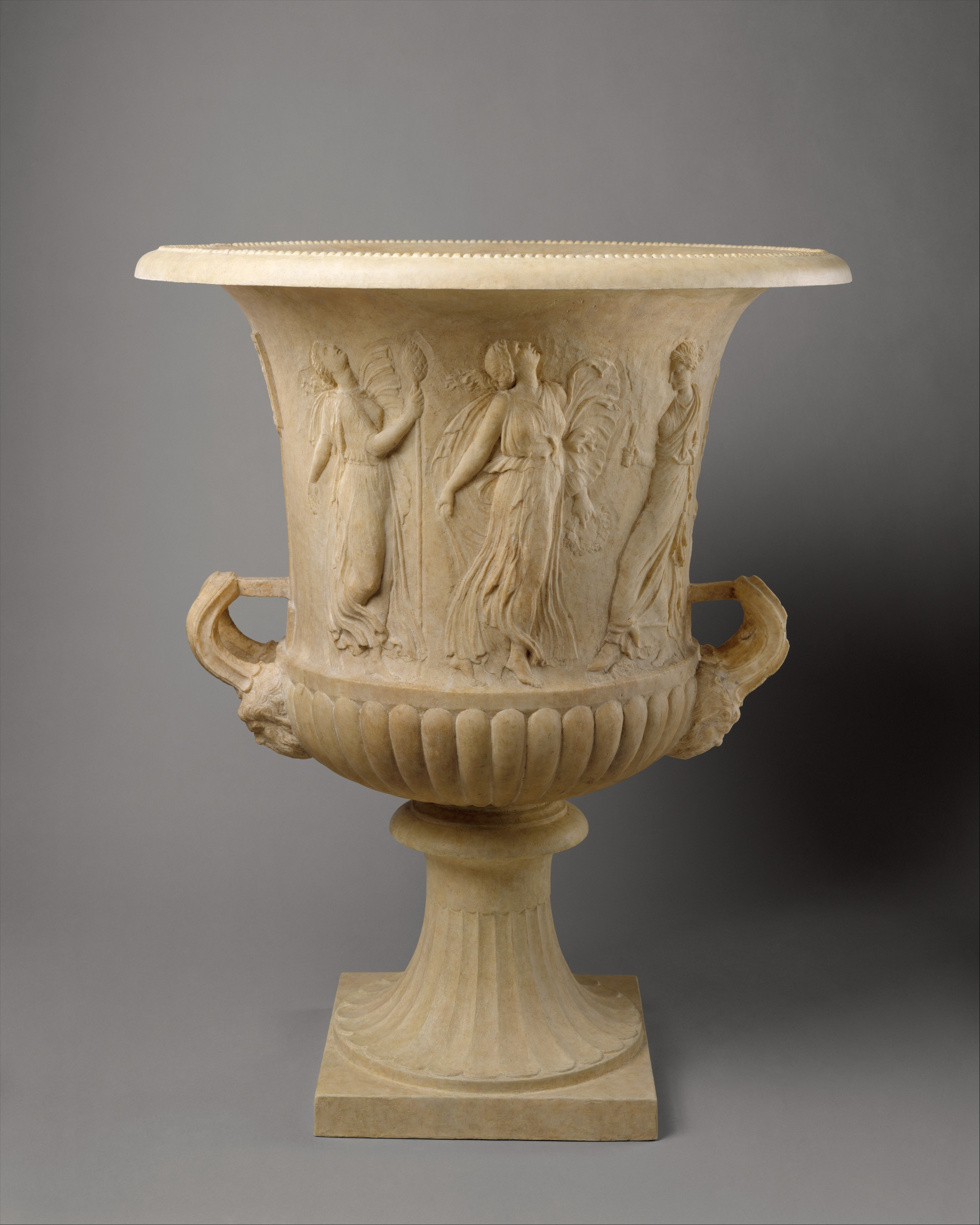
Calyx-krater with reliefs of maidens and dancing maenads; 1st century AD; Pentelic marble; height: 80.7 cm; Metropolitan Museum of Art

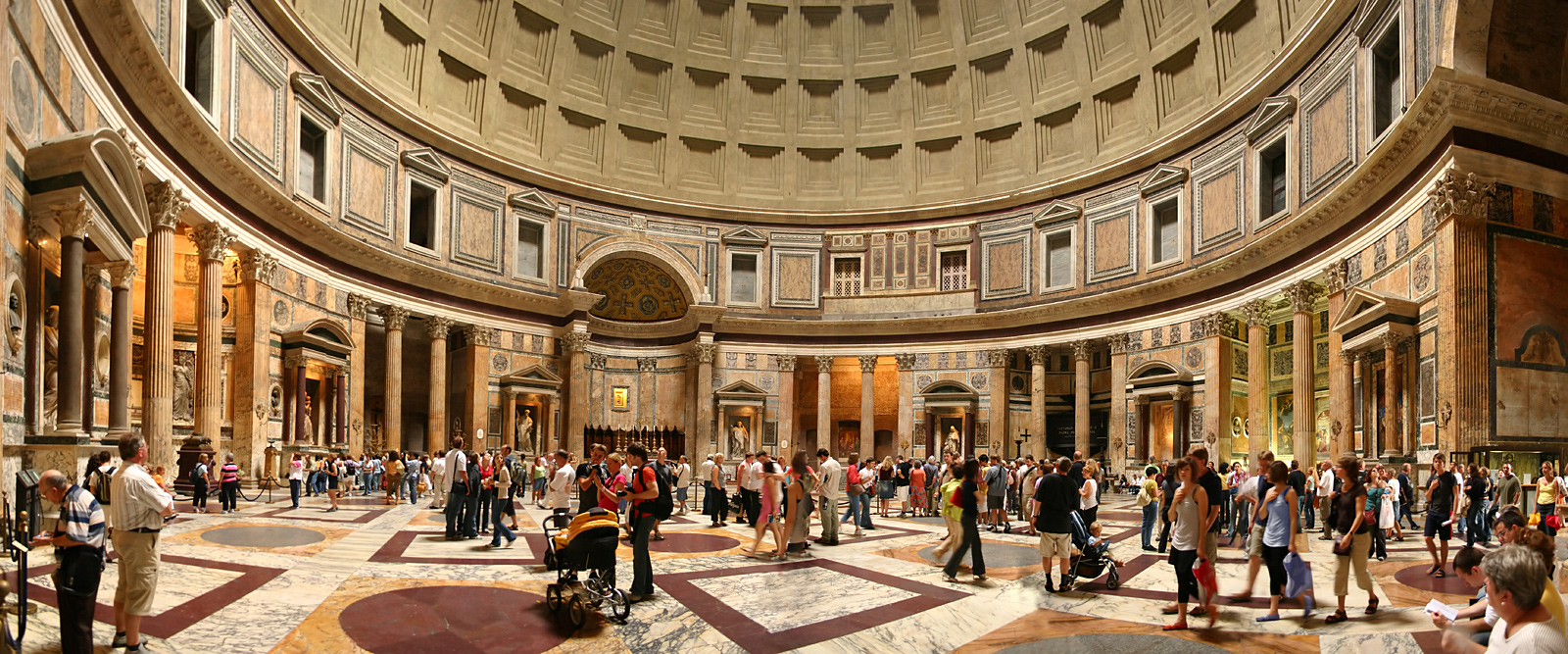
Panoramic view of the Pantheon (Rome), built between 113 and 125

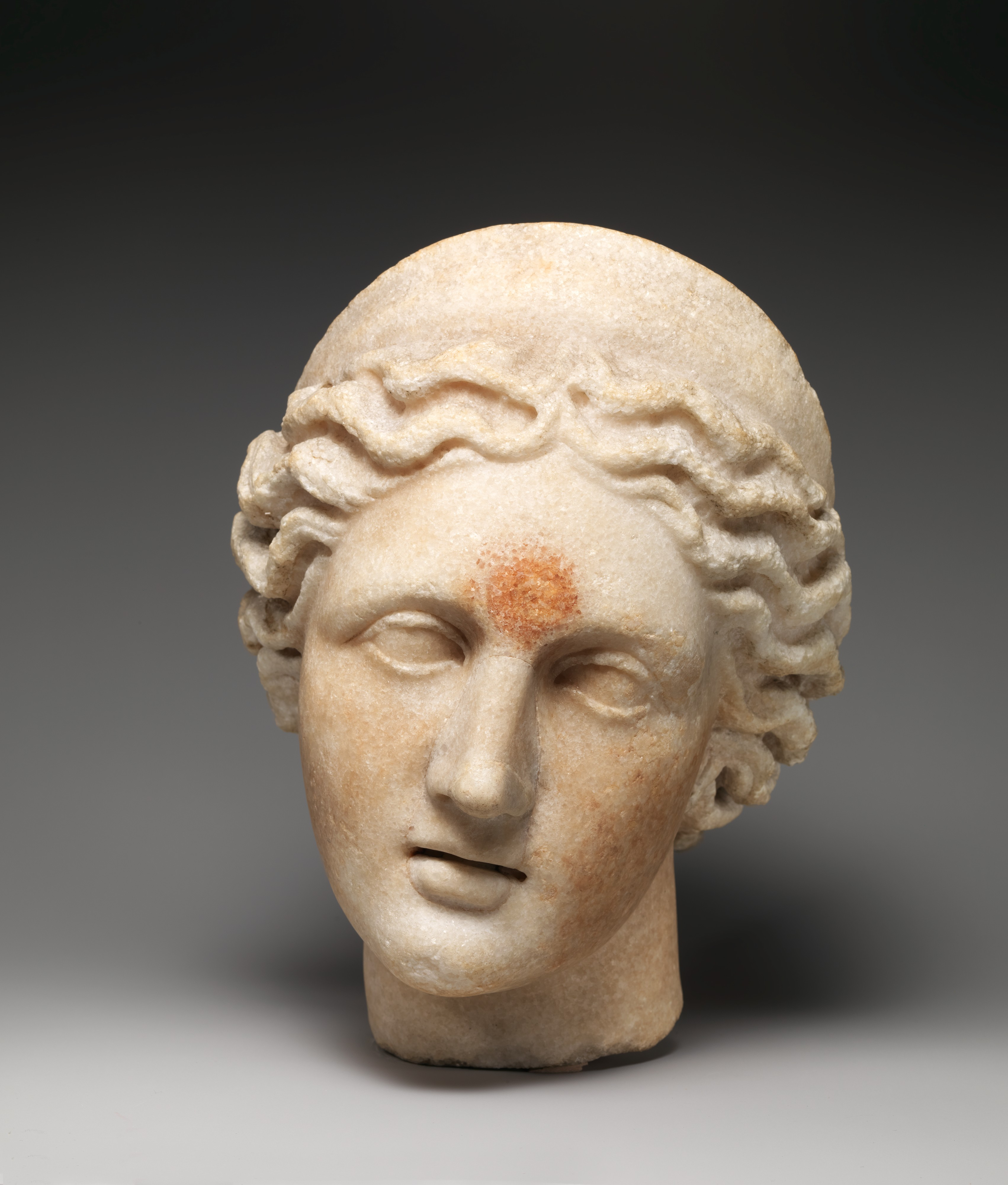
Head of a goddess wearing a diadem; 1st–2nd century; marble; height: 23 cm; Metropolitan Museum of Art

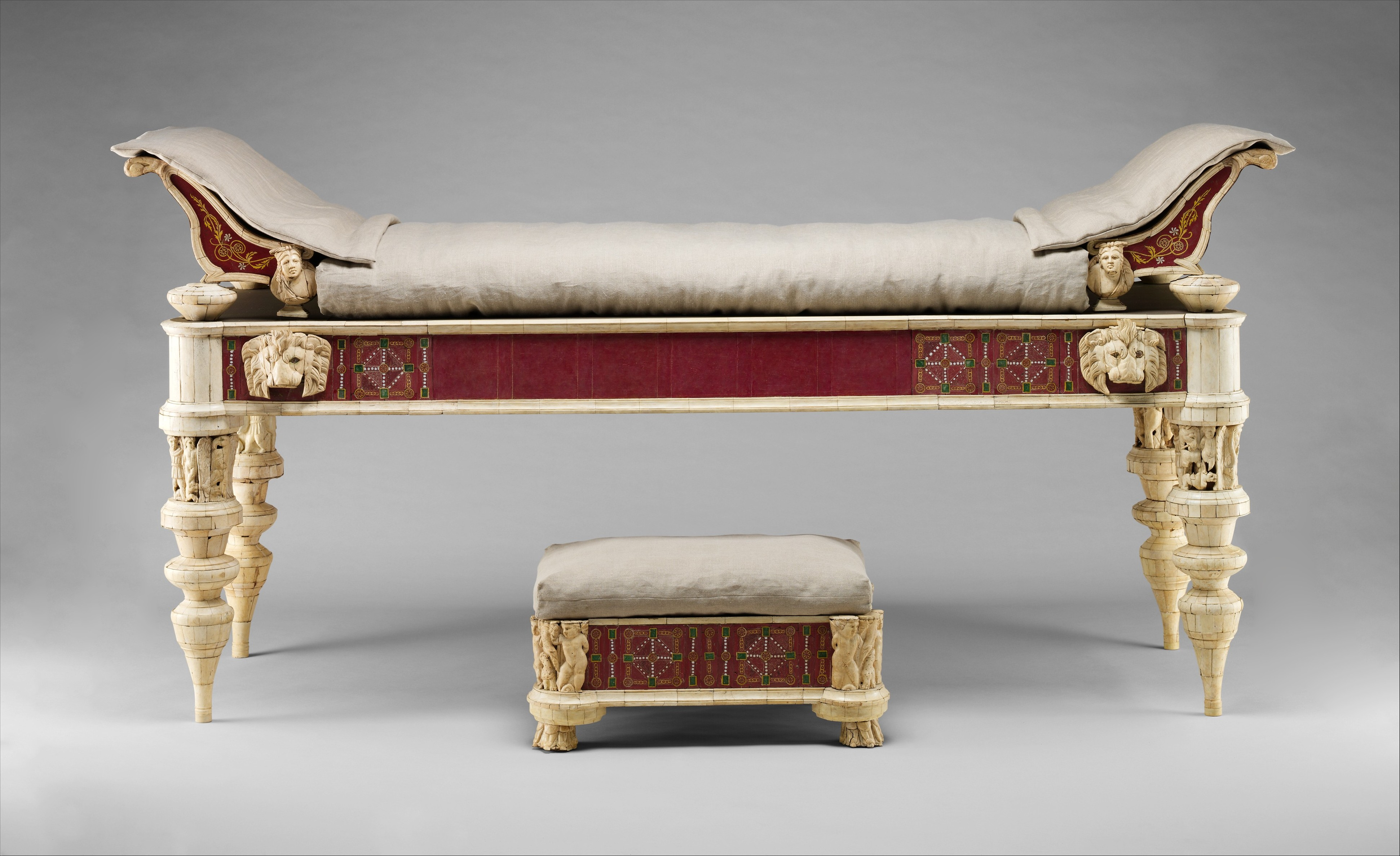
Couch and footstool; 1st–2nd century AD; wood, bone and glass; couch: 105.4 × 76.2 × 214.6 cm; Metropolitan Museum of Art

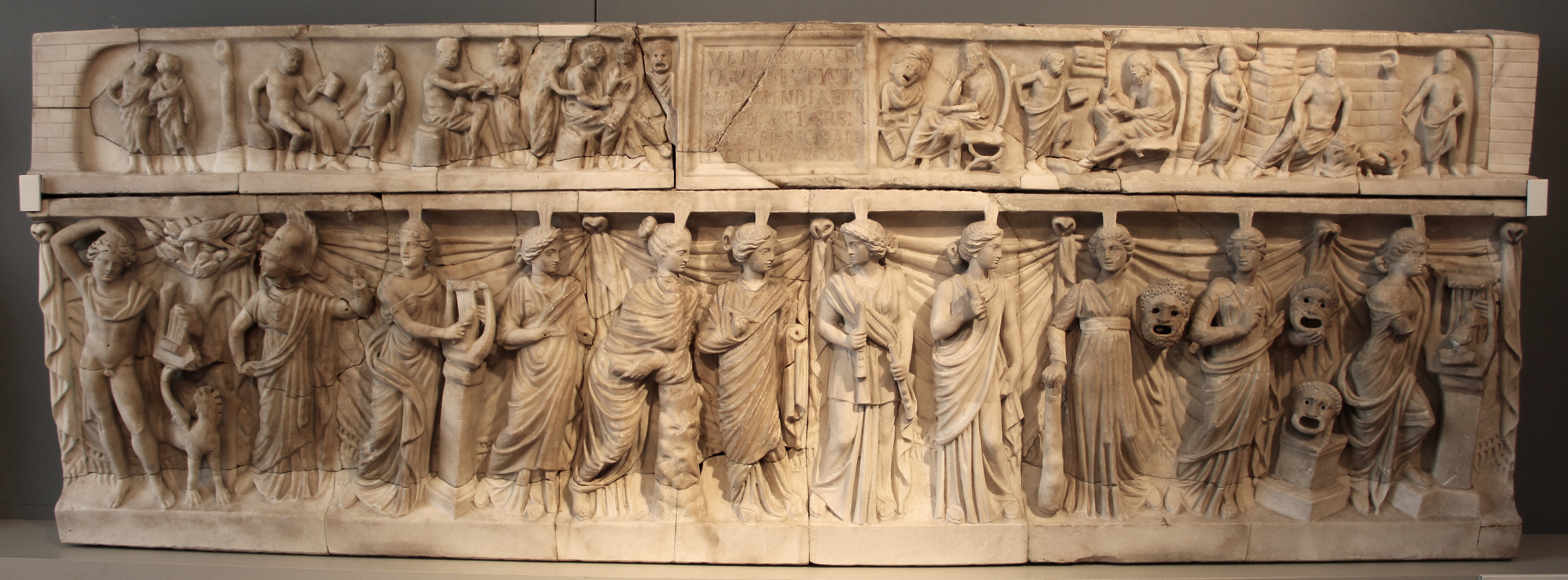
Sarcophagus with Apollo, Minerva and the Muses; circa 200 AD; from Via Appia; Antikensammlung Berlin (Berlin)

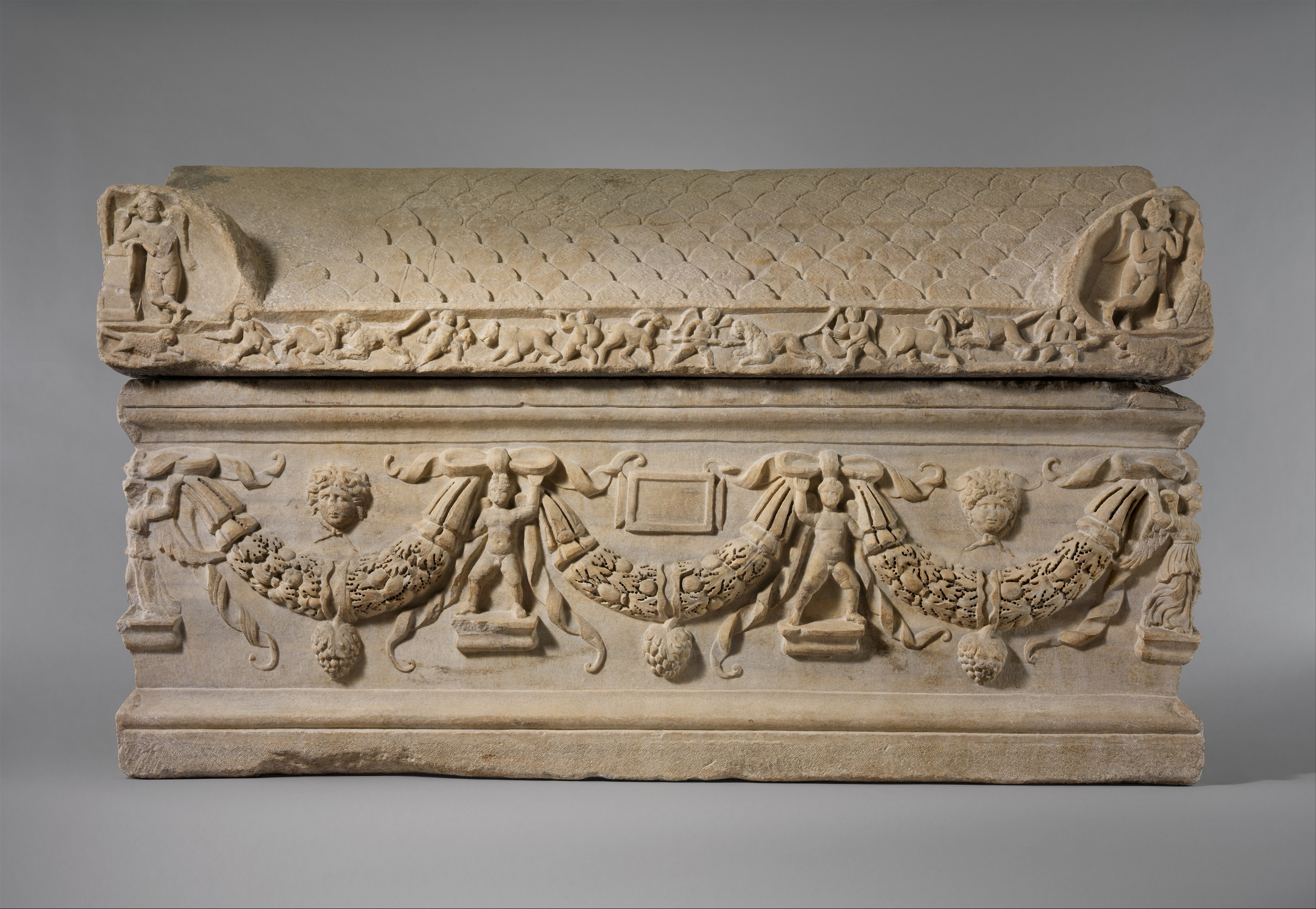
Sarcophagus with festoons; 200–225; marble; 134.6 x 223.5 cm; Metropolitan Museum of Art

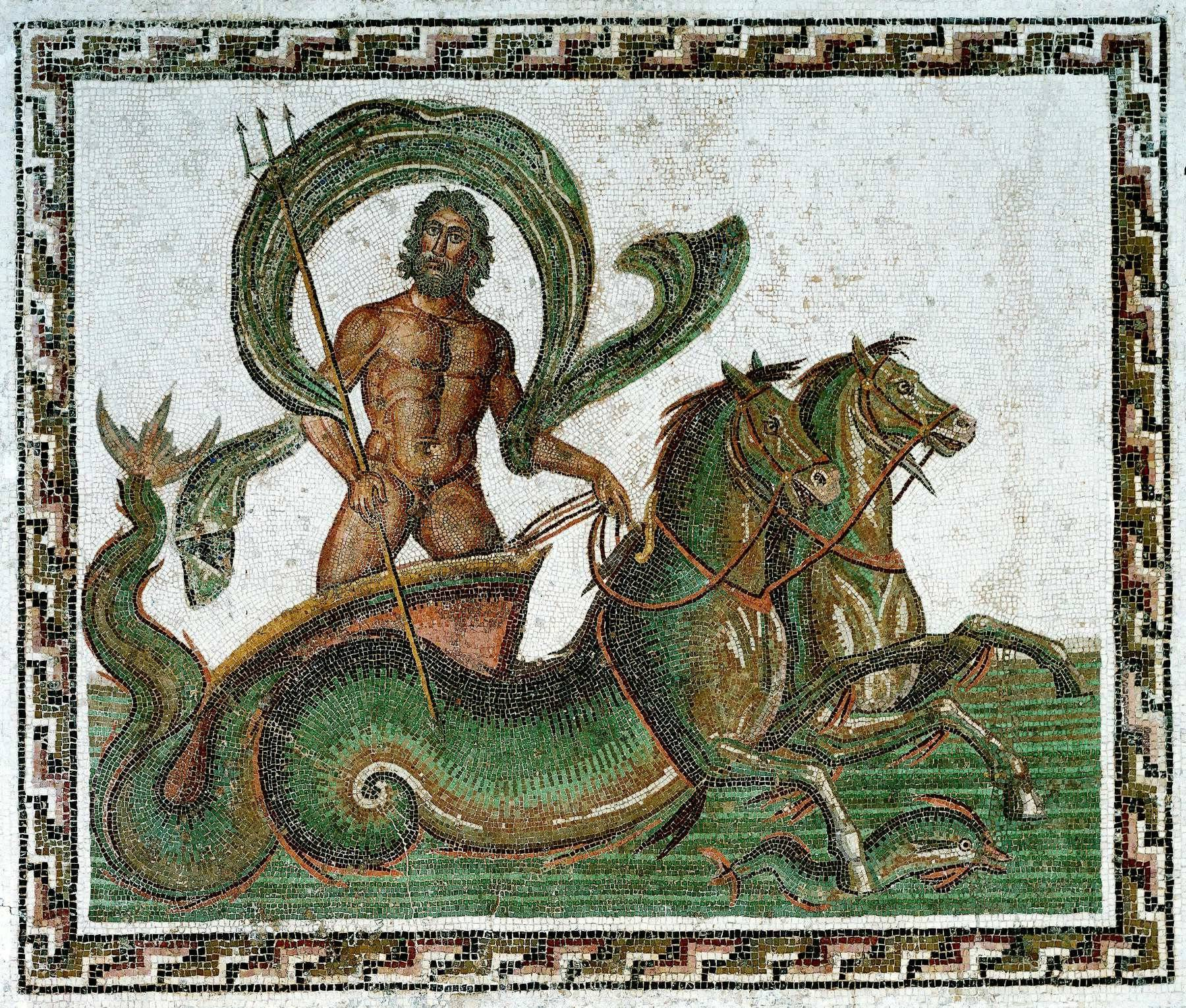
Triumph of Neptune standing on a chariot pulled by two sea horses; mid-3rd century; Sousse Archaeological Museum (Tunisia)

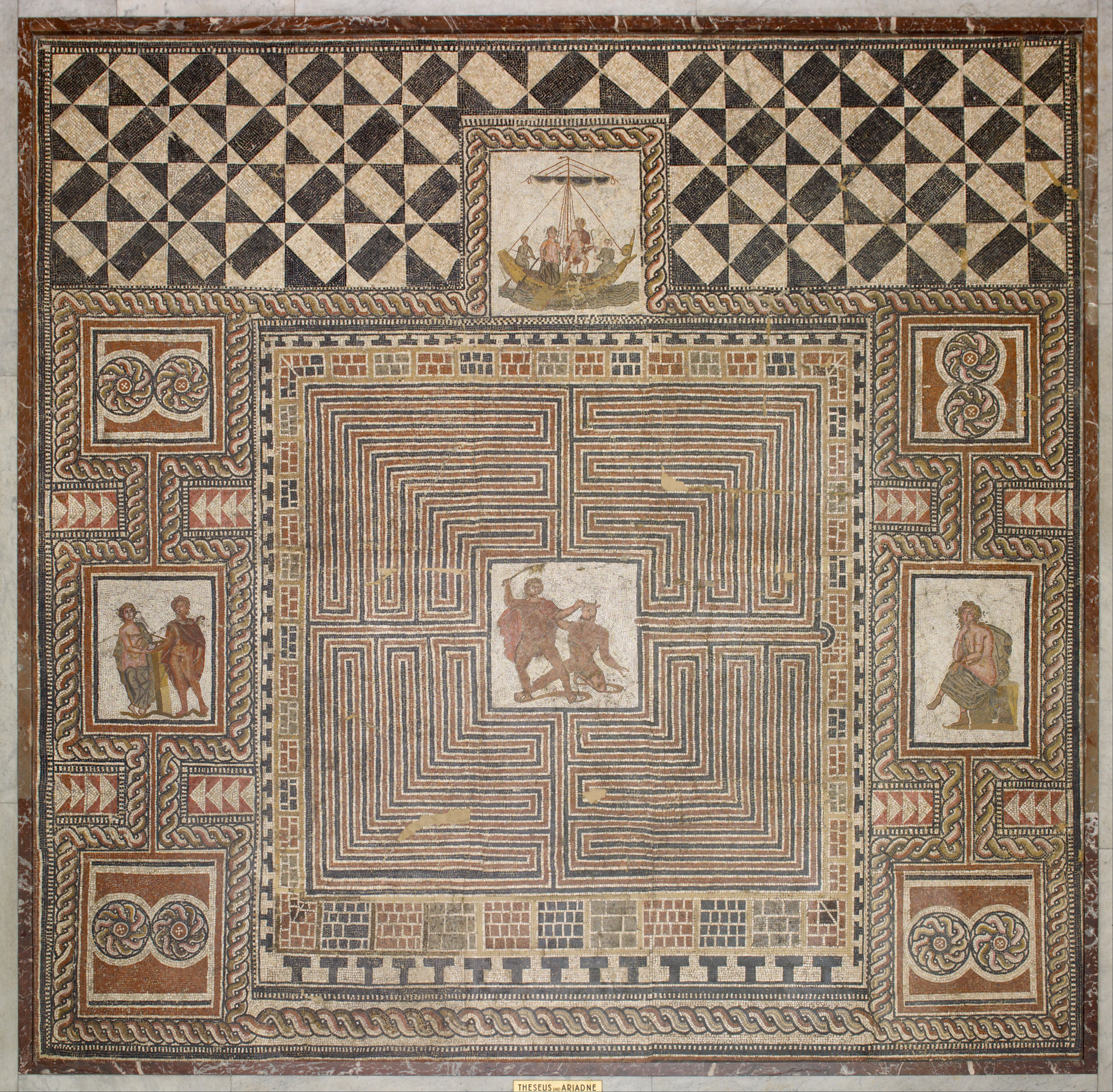
The Theseus Mosaic; 300-400 AD; marble and limestone pebbles; 4.1 x 4.2 m; Kunsthistorisches Museum (Vienna, Austria)

== Medieval ==
Most surviving art from the medieval period was religious in focus, often funded by the Church, powerful ecclesiastical individuals such as bishops, communal groups such as abbeys, or wealthy secular patrons. Many had specific liturgical functions—processional crosses and altarpieces, for example.

One of the central questions about medieval art concerns its lack of realism. A great deal of knowledge of perspective in art and understanding of the human figure was lost with the fall of Rome. But realism was not the primary concern of medieval artists. They were trying to convey a religious message, a task that demands clear, iconic images rather than precise renderings.

Time Period: 6th century to 15th century

=== Early medieval art ===
Migration period art is a general term for the art of the "barbarian" peoples who moved into formerly Roman territories. In the British Isles, Celtic art in the 7th and 8th centuries saw a fusion with Germanic traditions through contact with the Anglo-Saxons, forming what is called the Hiberno-Saxon style or Insular art, which became highly influential on the rest of the Middle Ages. The Franks developed Merovingian art until about 800, when Carolingian art combined insular influences with a self-conscious classical revival, developing into Ottonian art. Anglo-Saxon art is the art of England after the Insular period. Illuminated manuscripts contain nearly all the surviving paintings of the period, but architecture, metalwork, and small carved work in wood or ivory were also important media.

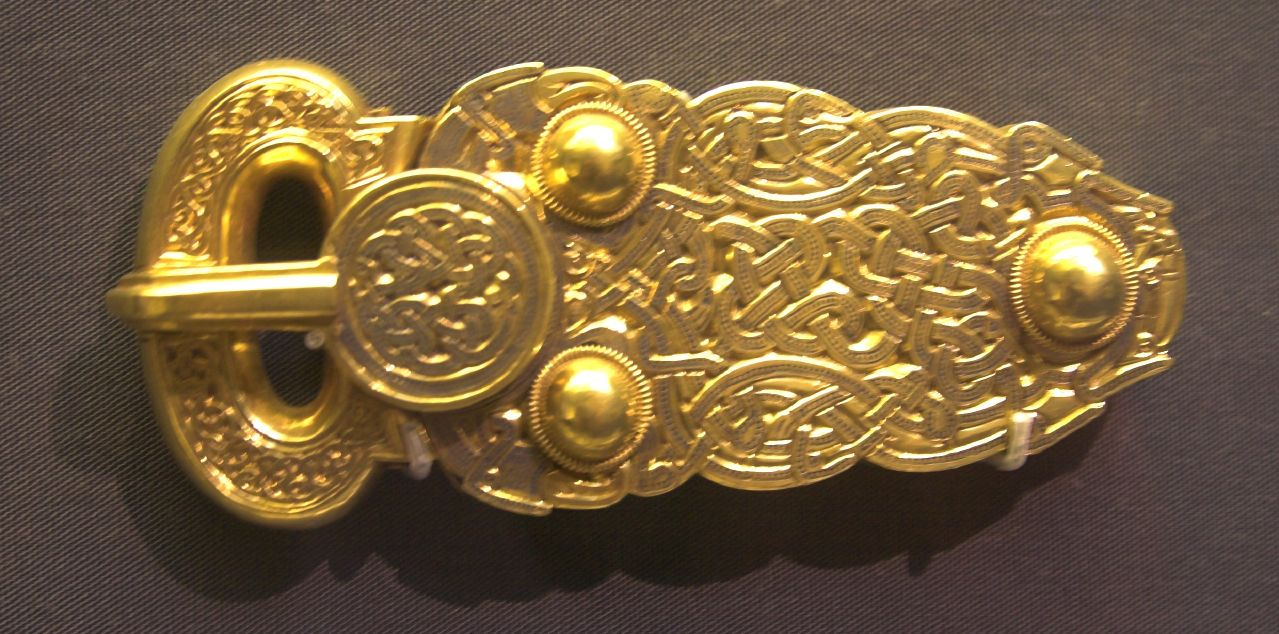
Buckle of Sutton Hoo; 580–620; gold and niello; length: 13.1 cm; British Museum (London)

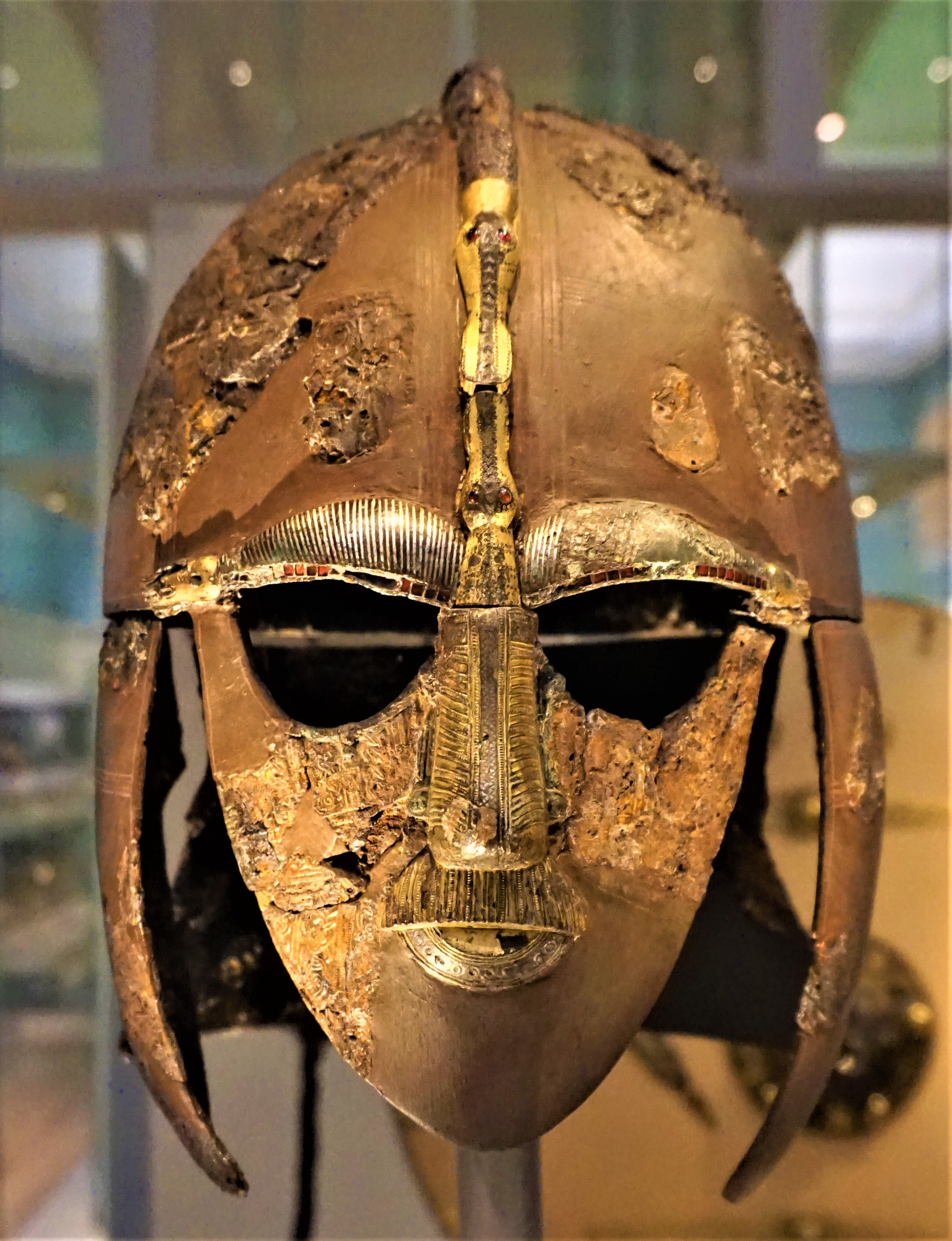
The helmet of Sutton Hoo; early 7th century AD; coppery alloy, iron, gold and garnet; height: 31.8 cm; British Museum

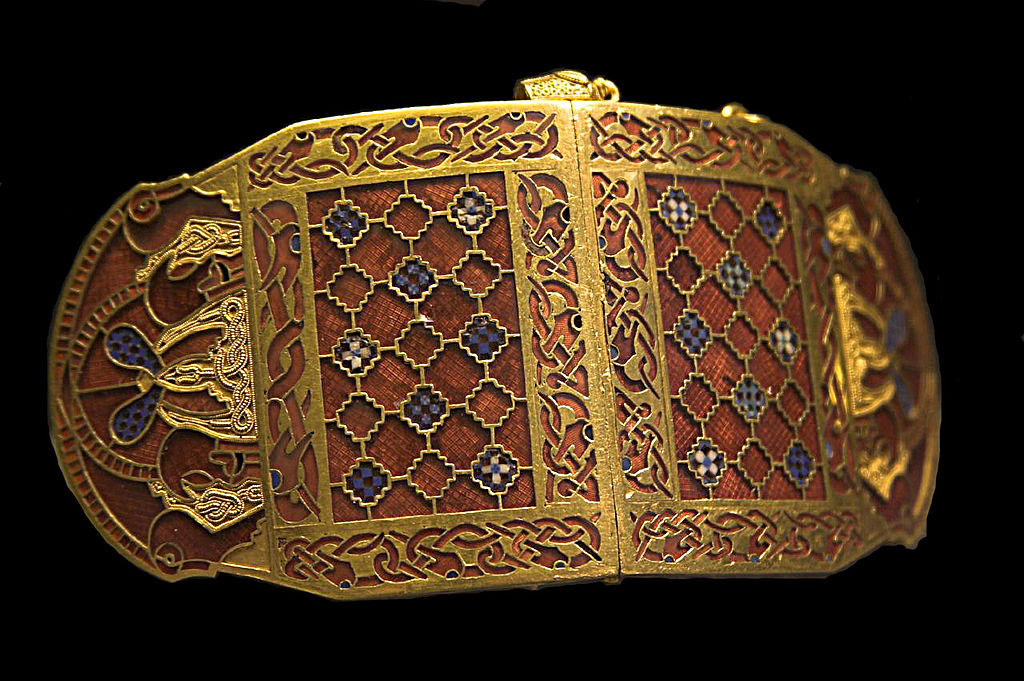
Shoulder-clasps from Sutton Hoo; early 7th century; gold, glass & garnet; length: 12.7 cm; British Museum

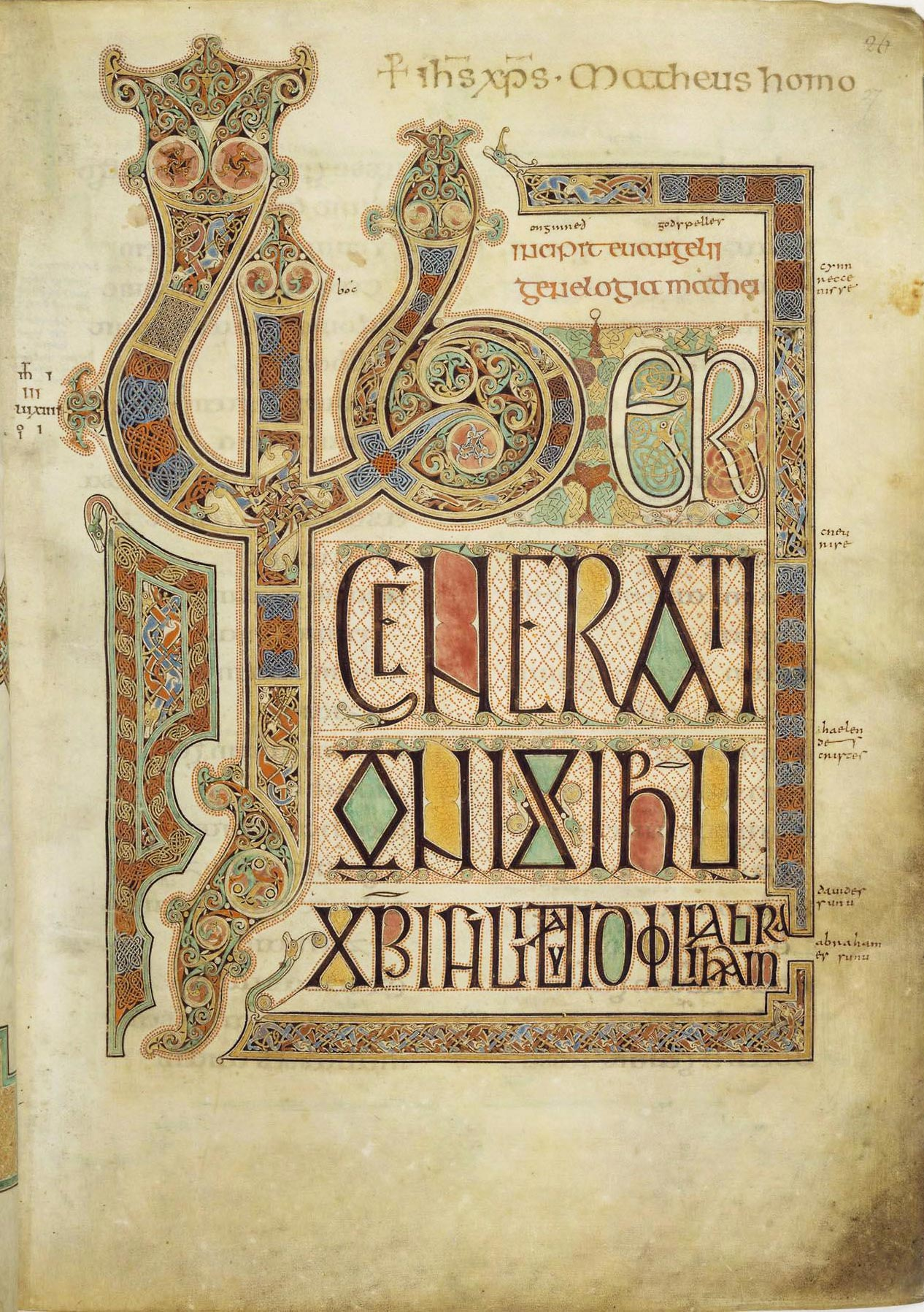
The Incipit to the Gospel of Matthew from the Book of Lindisfarne; late 7th century; ink and pigments on vellum; 34 x 25 cm; British Library (London)

=== Byzantine ===
Byzantine art overlaps with or merges with what we call Early Christian art until the iconoclasm period of 730-843, when the vast majority of artwork with figures was destroyed; so little remains that today any discovery sheds new understanding. From 843 to 1453, there is a clear Byzantine art tradition. It is often the finest art of the Middle Ages in terms of the quality of materials and artistry, with production centered in Constantinople. Byzantine art's crowning achievement was the monumental frescoes and mosaics in domed churches, most of which have not survived due to natural disasters and the conversion of churches into mosques.

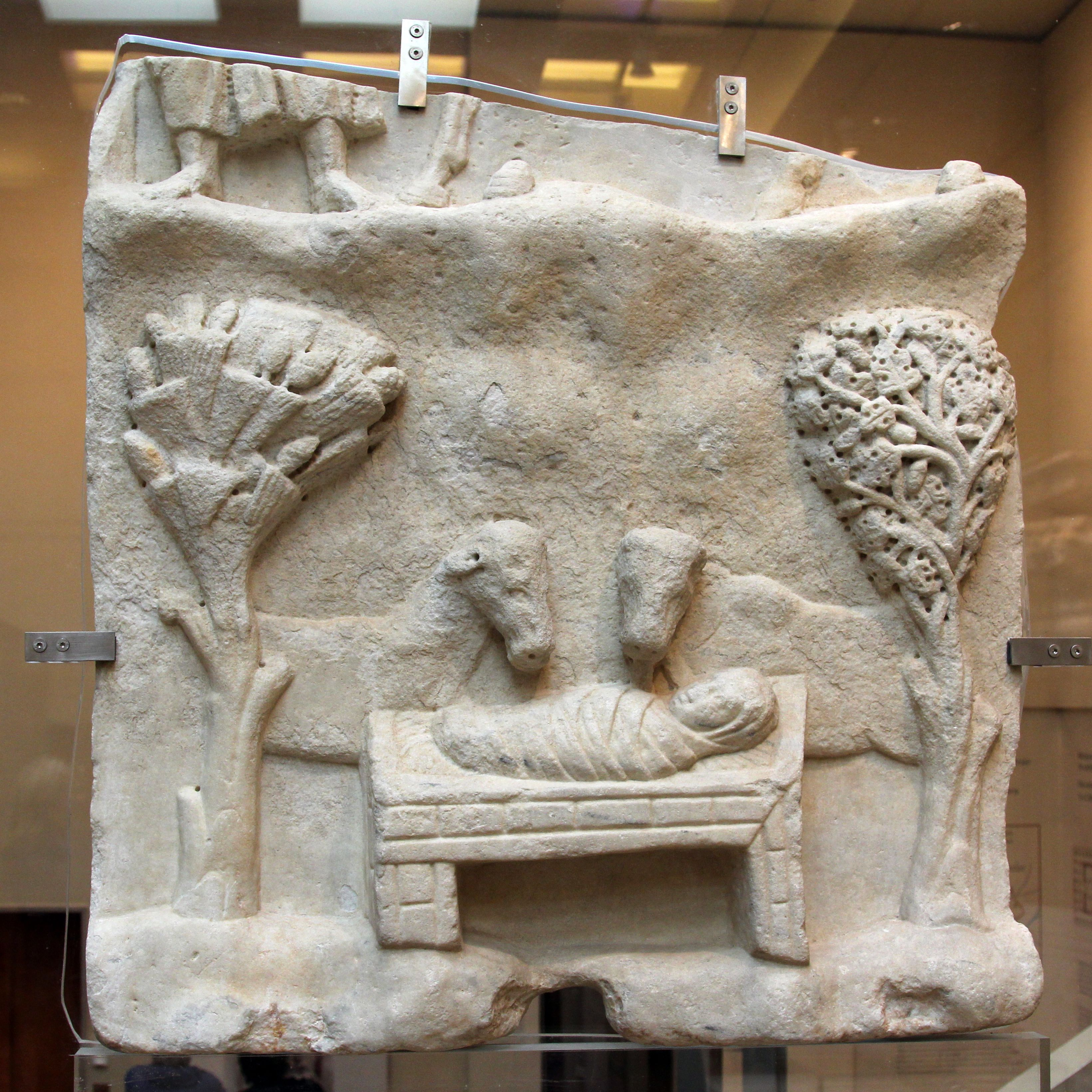
Slab with a relief representing the Nativity of Jesus; 4th-early 5th century; marble; Byzantine and Christian Museum (Athens)

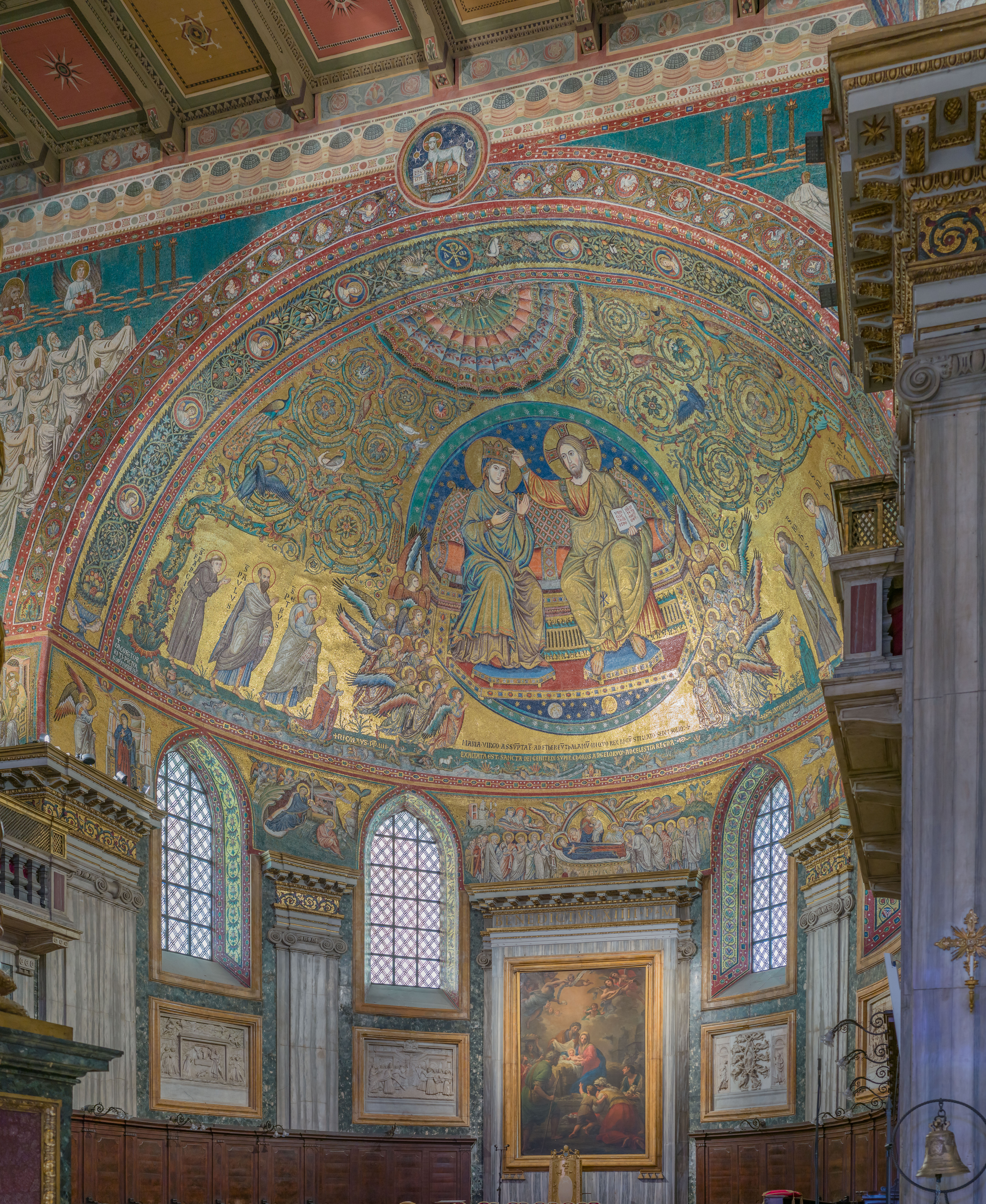
Apse of the Santa Maria Maggiore church in Rome, decorated in the 5th century with this glamorous mosaic

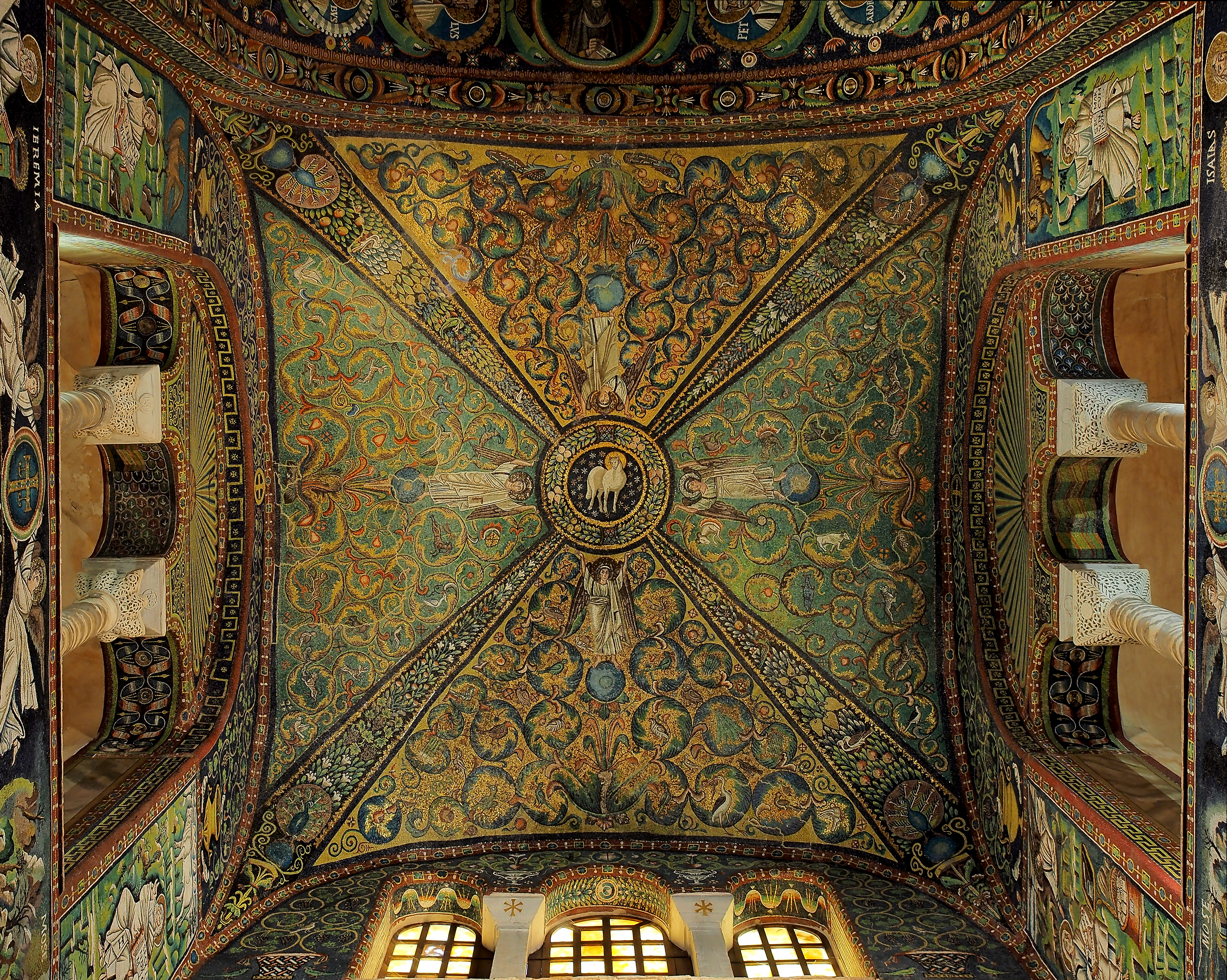
Mosaics on a ceiling and some walls of the Basilica of San Vitale in Ravenna (Italy), circa 547 AD

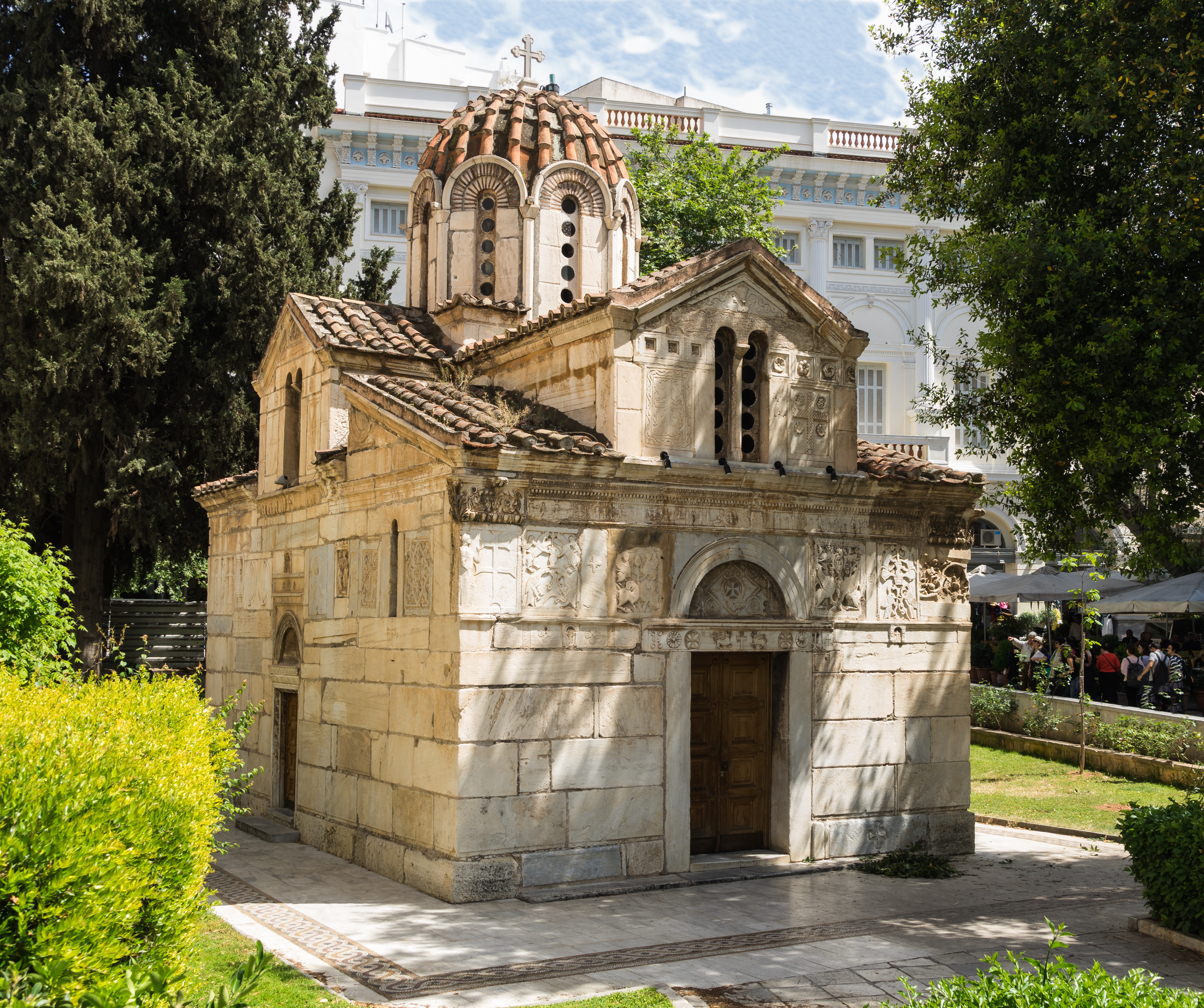
The Little Metropolis in Athens, built on unknown dates, between the 9th century to the 13th century

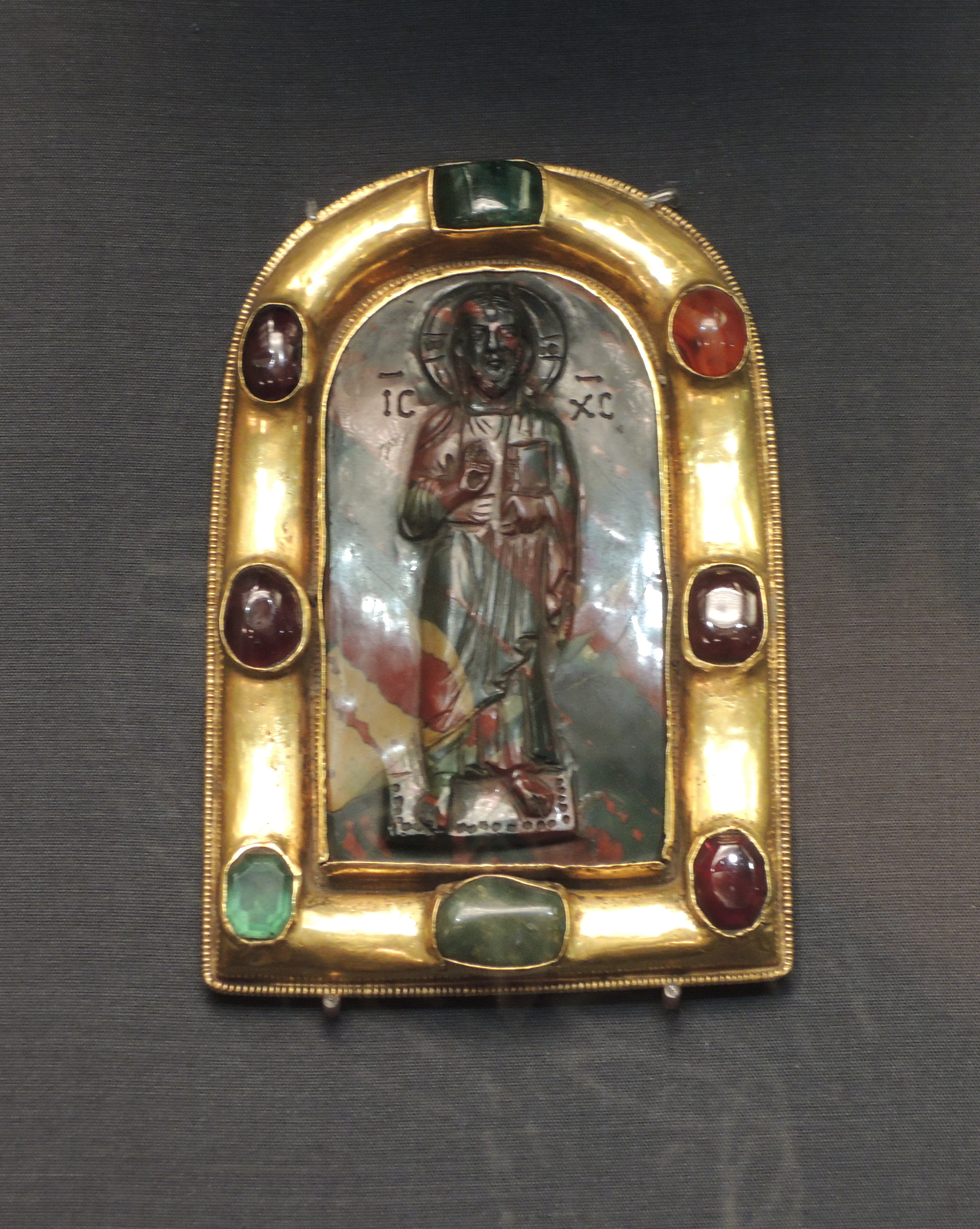
Cameo; 10th-11th centuries; jasper, almandine, emerald and chrysoprase; from Constantinople; Moscow Kremlin Museums (Russia)

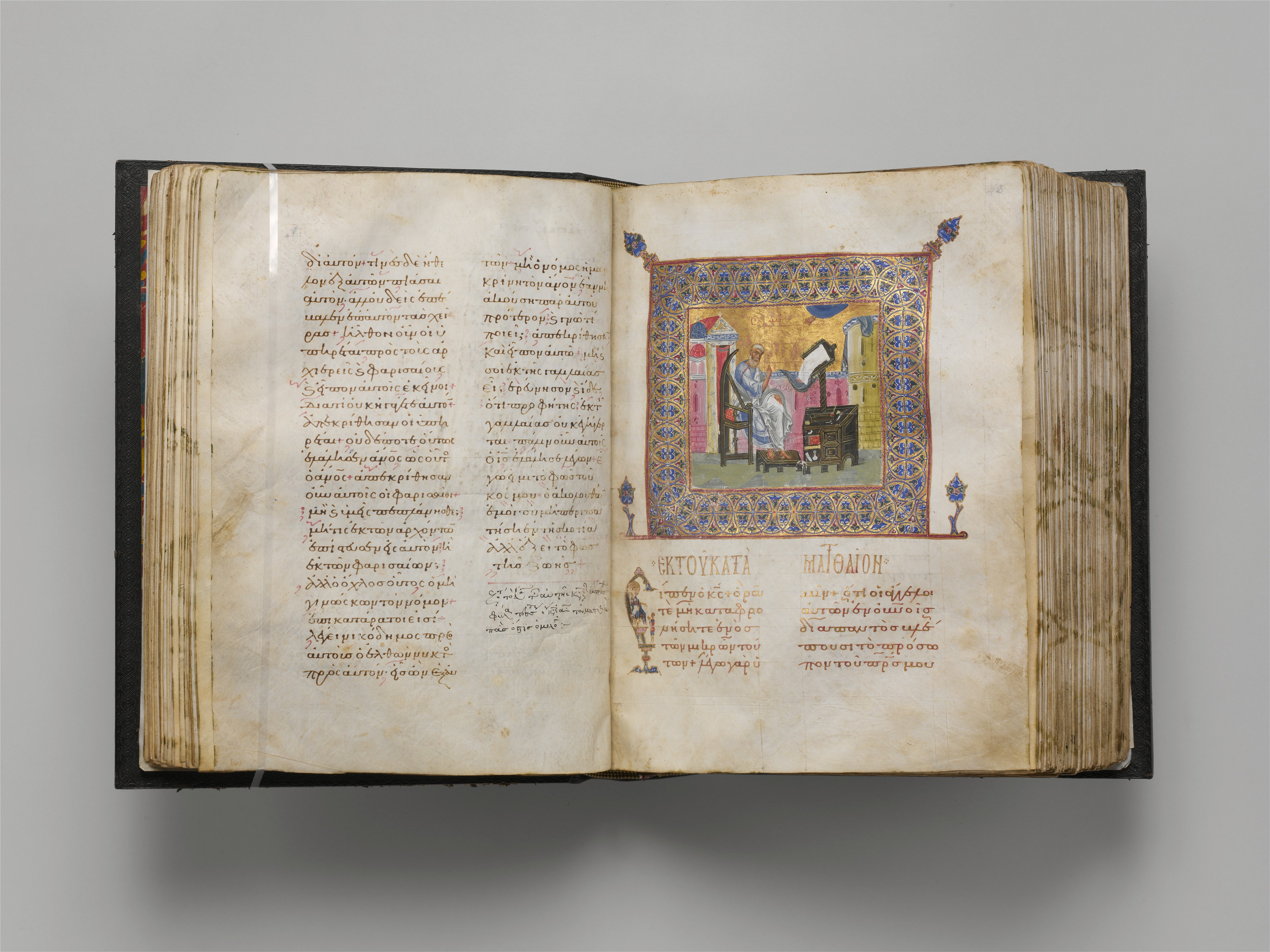
Gospel lectionary; circa 1100; tempera, gold, and ink on parchment, and leather binding; overall: 36.8 x 29.6 x 12.4 cm, folio: 35 x 26.2 cm; Metropolitan Museum of Art (New York City)

Icon of the New Testament Trinity; circa 1450; tempera and gold on wood panel (poplar); Cleveland Museum of Art (Cleveland, Ohio, US)

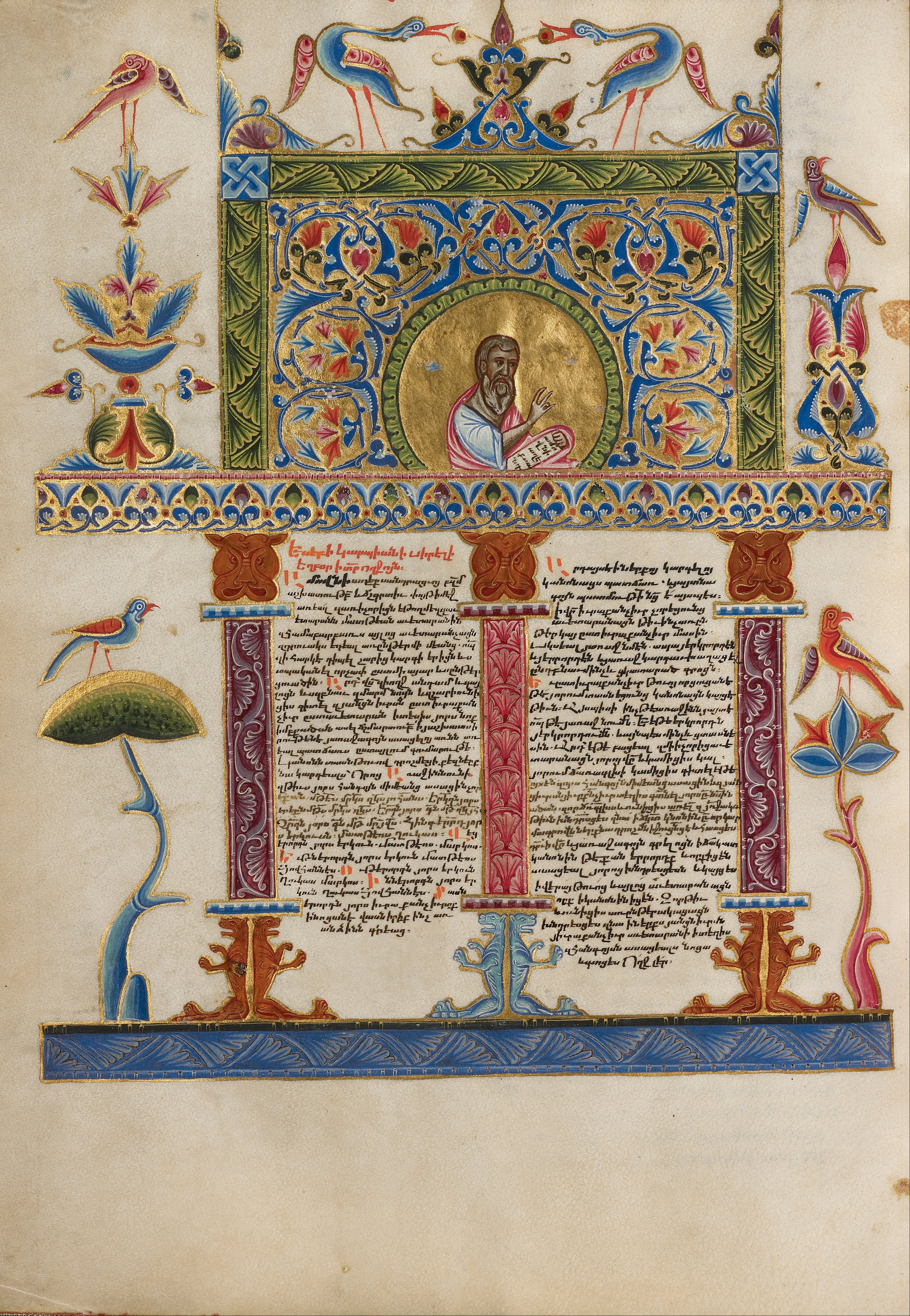
Page of an Armenian illuminated manuscript; 1637–1638; tempera colors, gold paint, and gold leaf on parchment; height: 25.2 cm; Getty Center (Los Angeles)

=== Romanesque ===
Romanesque art refers to the period from about 1000 to the rise of Gothic art in the 12th century. This was a period of increasing prosperity, and the first to see a coherent style used across Europe, from Scandinavia to Sicily. Romanesque art is vigorous and direct, was originally brightly coloured, and is often very sophisticated. Stained glass and enamel on metalwork became important media, and larger sculptures in the round developed, although high relief was the principal technique. Its architecture is dominated by thick walls, and round-headed windows and arches, with much carved decoration.

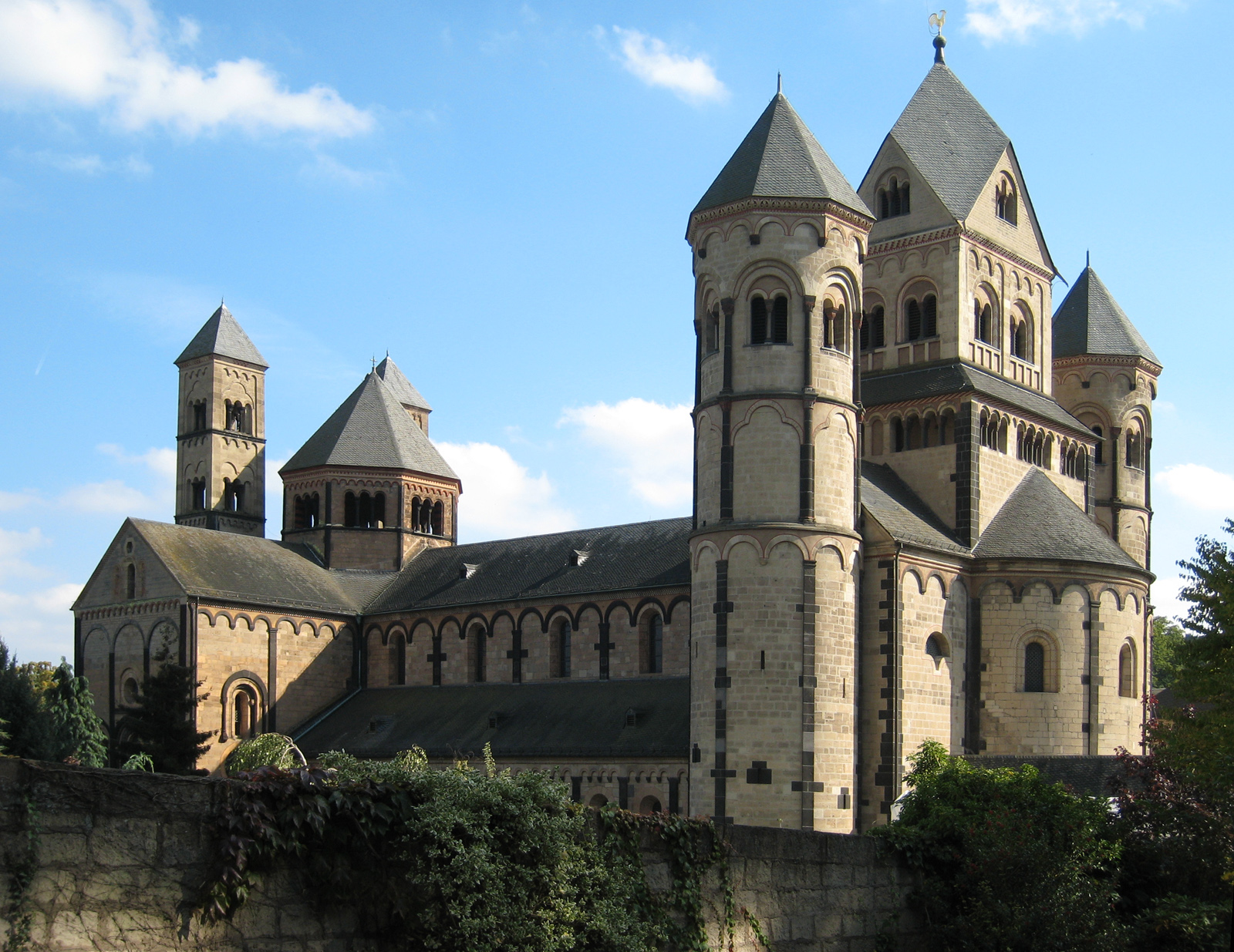
Maria Laach Abbey (near Andernach, Germany), one of the most iconic Romanesque churches

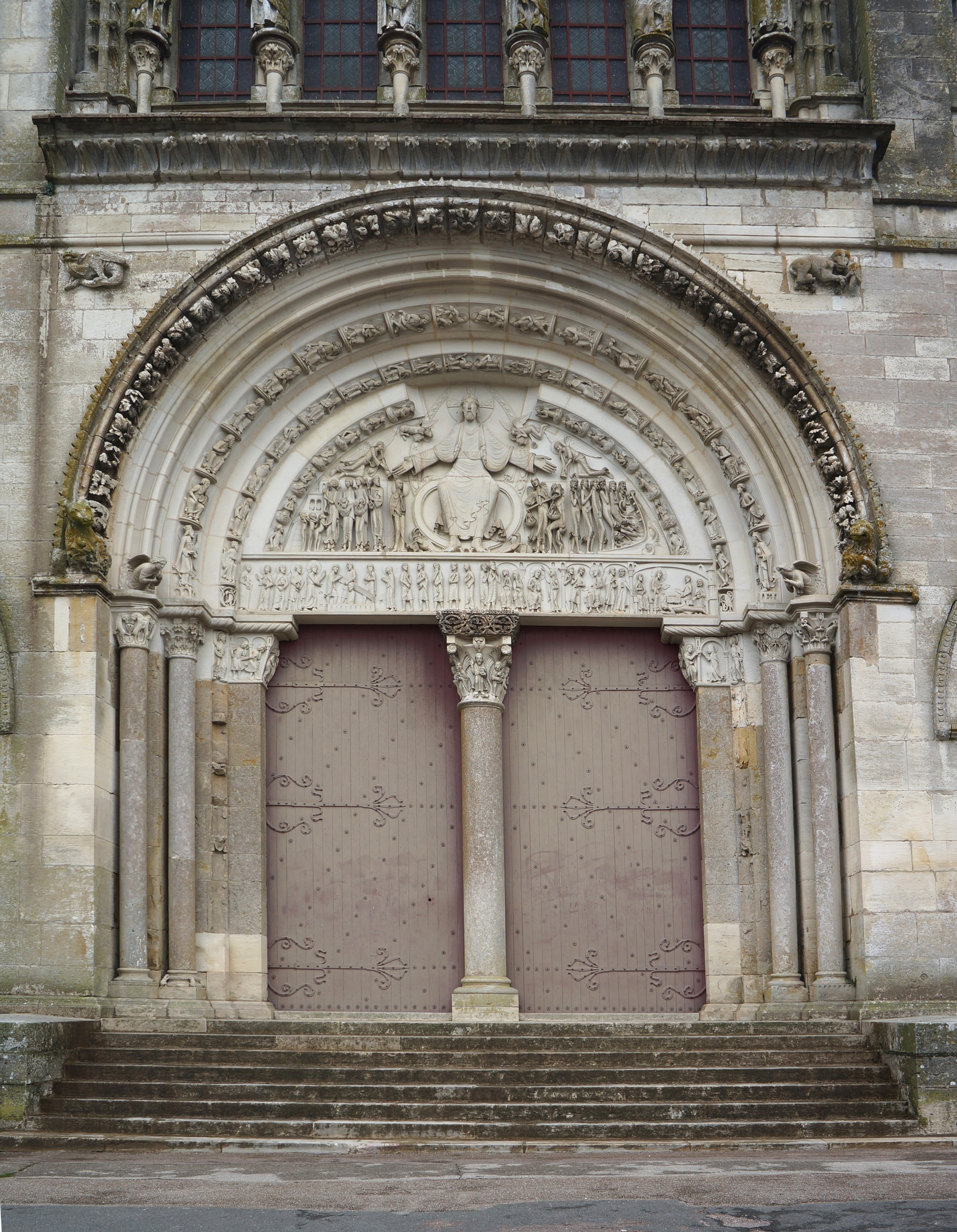
Stone bas-relief of Jesus, from the Vézelay Abbey (Burgundy, France)

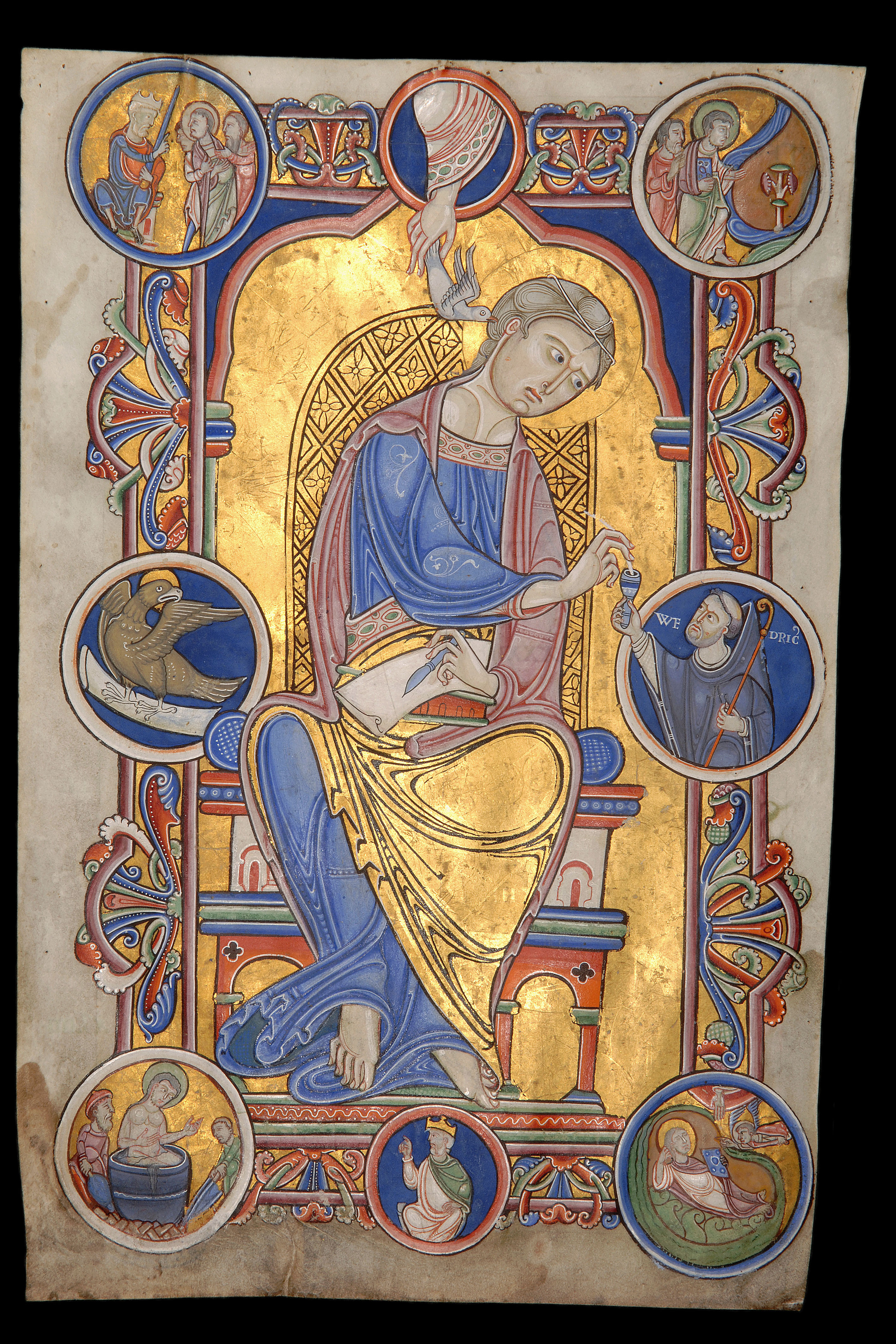
Miniature of Saint John the Evangelist; before 1147; illumination on parchment; 35.5 cm; Avesnes-sur-Helpe (France)

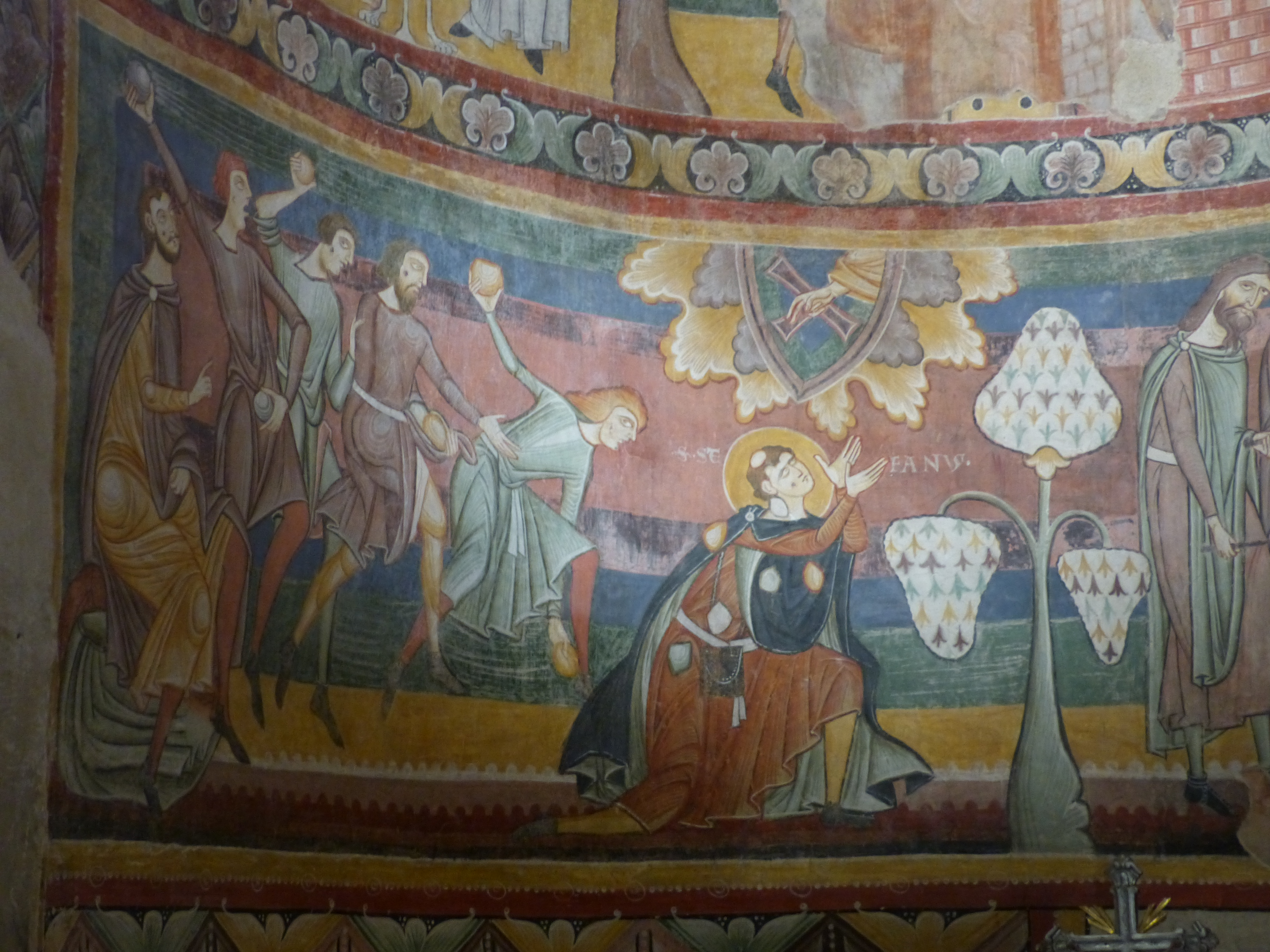
The stoning of Saint Stephen; 1160s; fresco; height: 1.3 m; Saint John Abbey (Val Müstair, Canton of Grisons, Switzerland)

=== Gothic ===
Gothic art is a variable term depending on the craft, place, and time. The term originated with Gothic architecture in 1140, but Gothic painting did not appear until around 1200 (this date has many qualifications), when it diverged from Romanesque style. Gothic sculpture was born in France in 1144 with the renovation of the Abbey Church of S. Denis and spread throughout Europe, by the 13th century it had become the international style, replacing Romanesque. International Gothic describes Gothic art from about 1360 to 1430, after which Gothic art merges into Renaissance art at different times in different places. During this period, forms such as painting, in fresco and on panel, become newly important, and the period ends with new media such as prints.

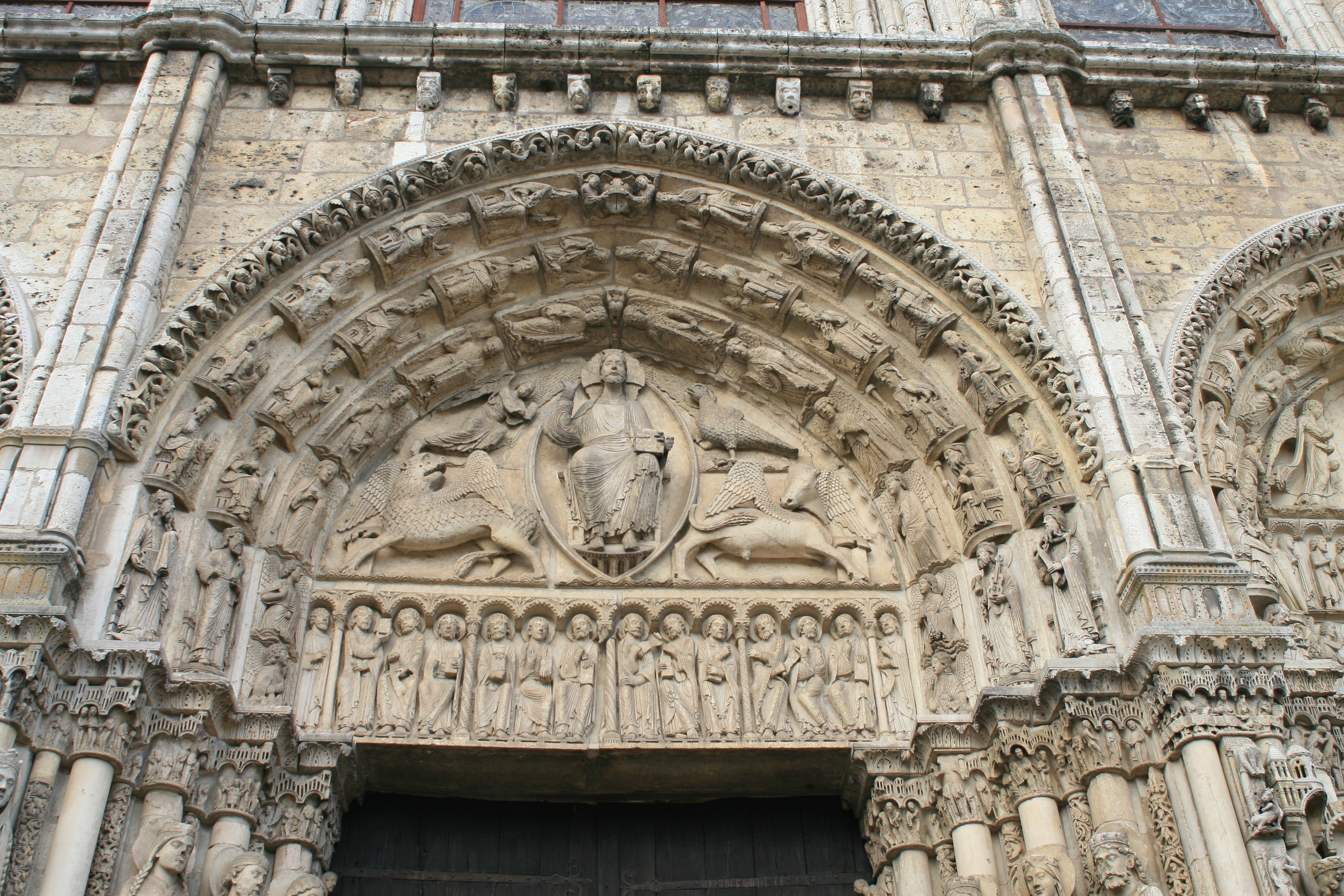
Part of the Royal Portal; 1145–1155; limestone; Chartres Cathedral (Chartres, France)

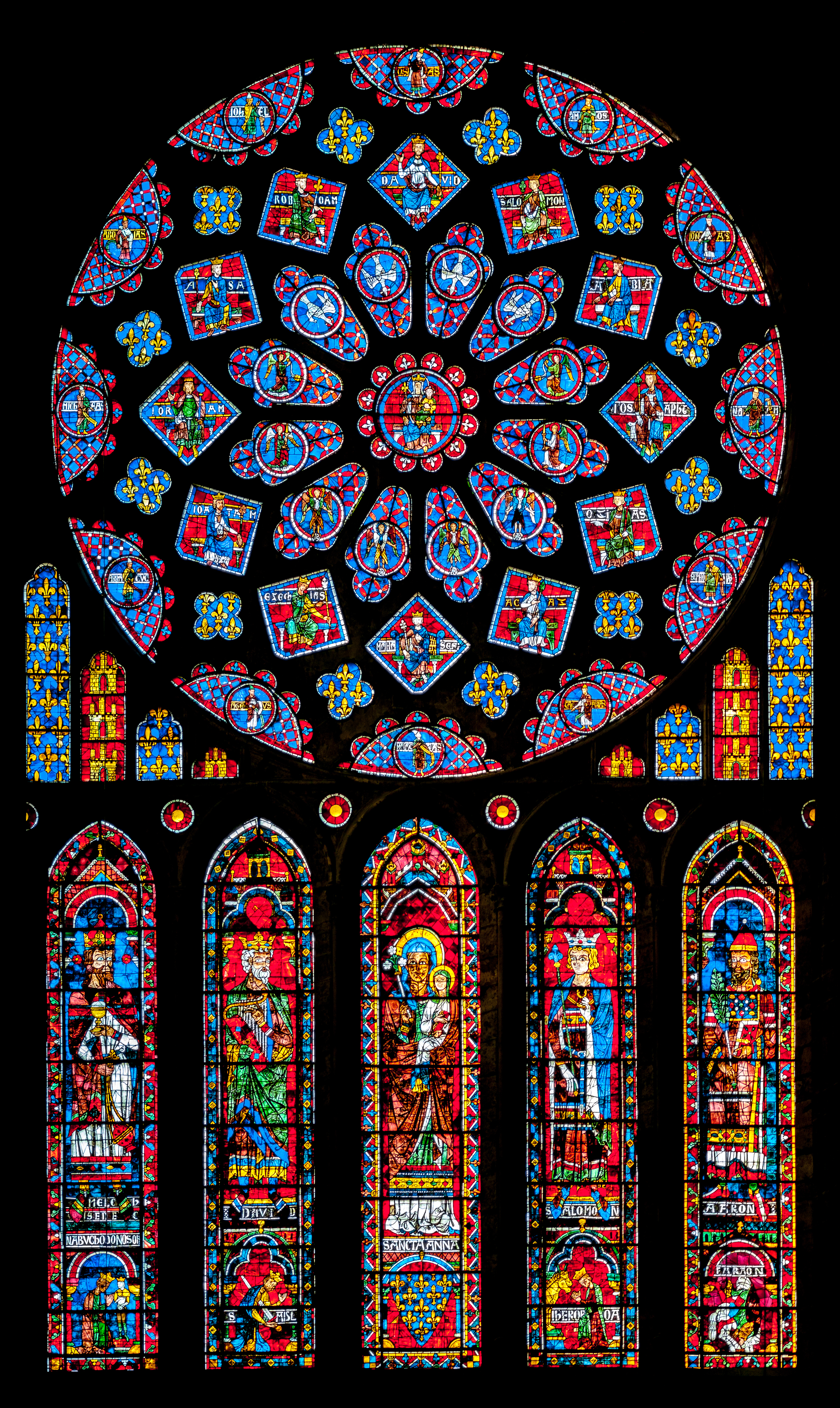
North transept windows; circa 1230–1235; stained glass; diameter (rose window): 10.2 m; Chartres Cathedral

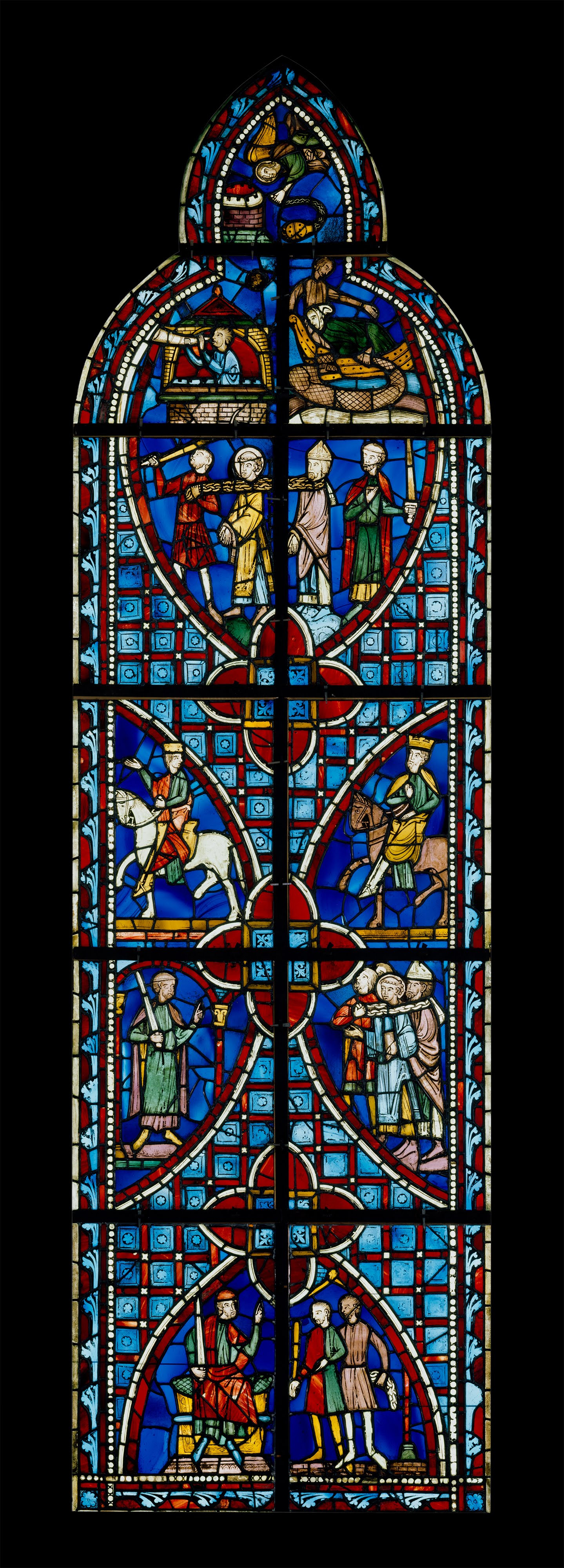
Scenes from the Legend of Saint Vincent of Saragossa; 1245–1247; pot-metal glass, vitreous paint, and lead; overall: 373.4 x 110.5 cm; Metropolitan Museum of Art (New York City)

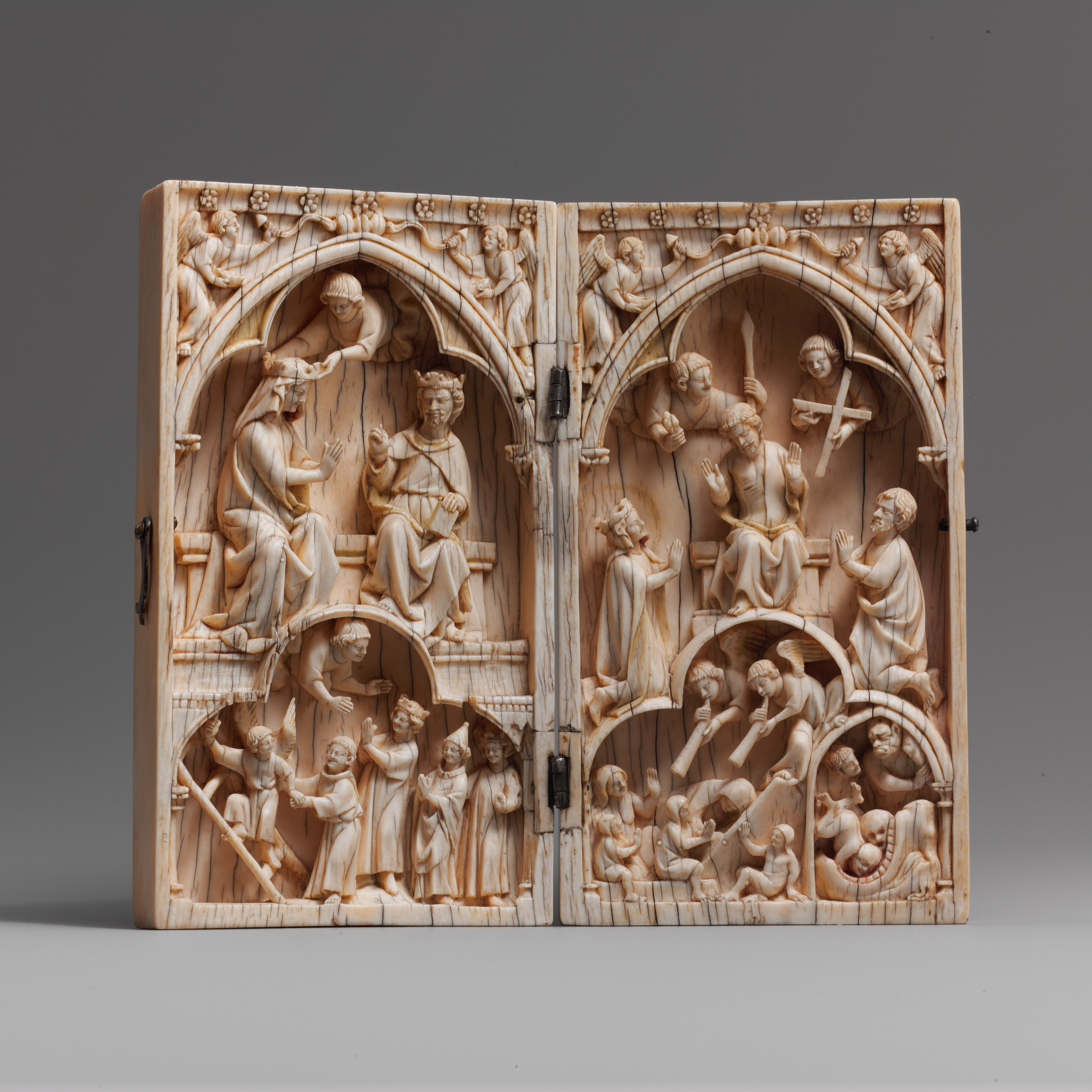
French diptych with the coronation of the Virgin and the Last Judgment; 1260–1270; elephant ivory with metal mounts; overall: 12.7 x 13 x 1.9 cm; Metropolitan Museum of Art

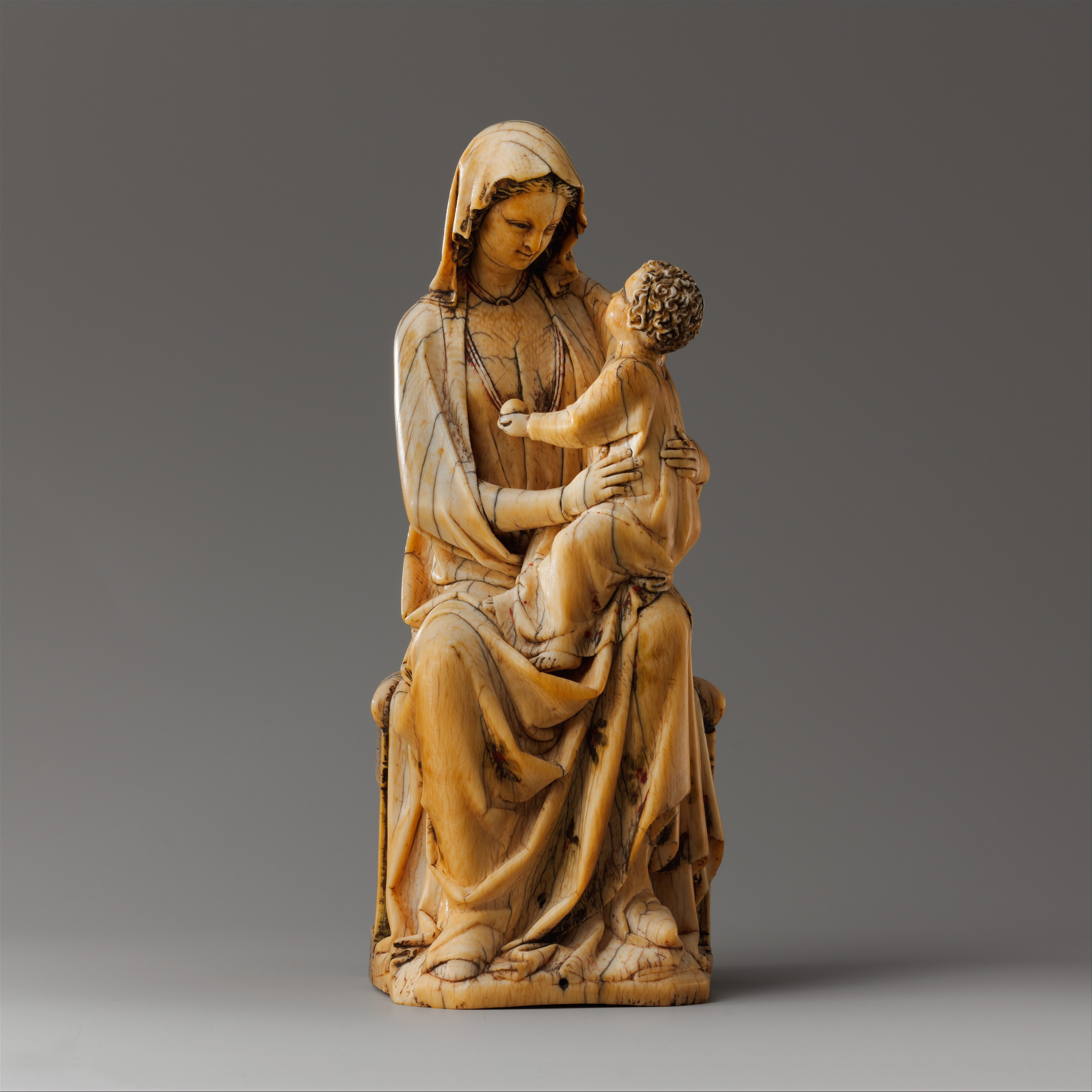
Enthroned Virgin and child; 1260–1280; elephant ivory with traces of paint and gilding; overall: 18.4 x 7.6 x 7.3 cm; Metropolitan Museum of Art

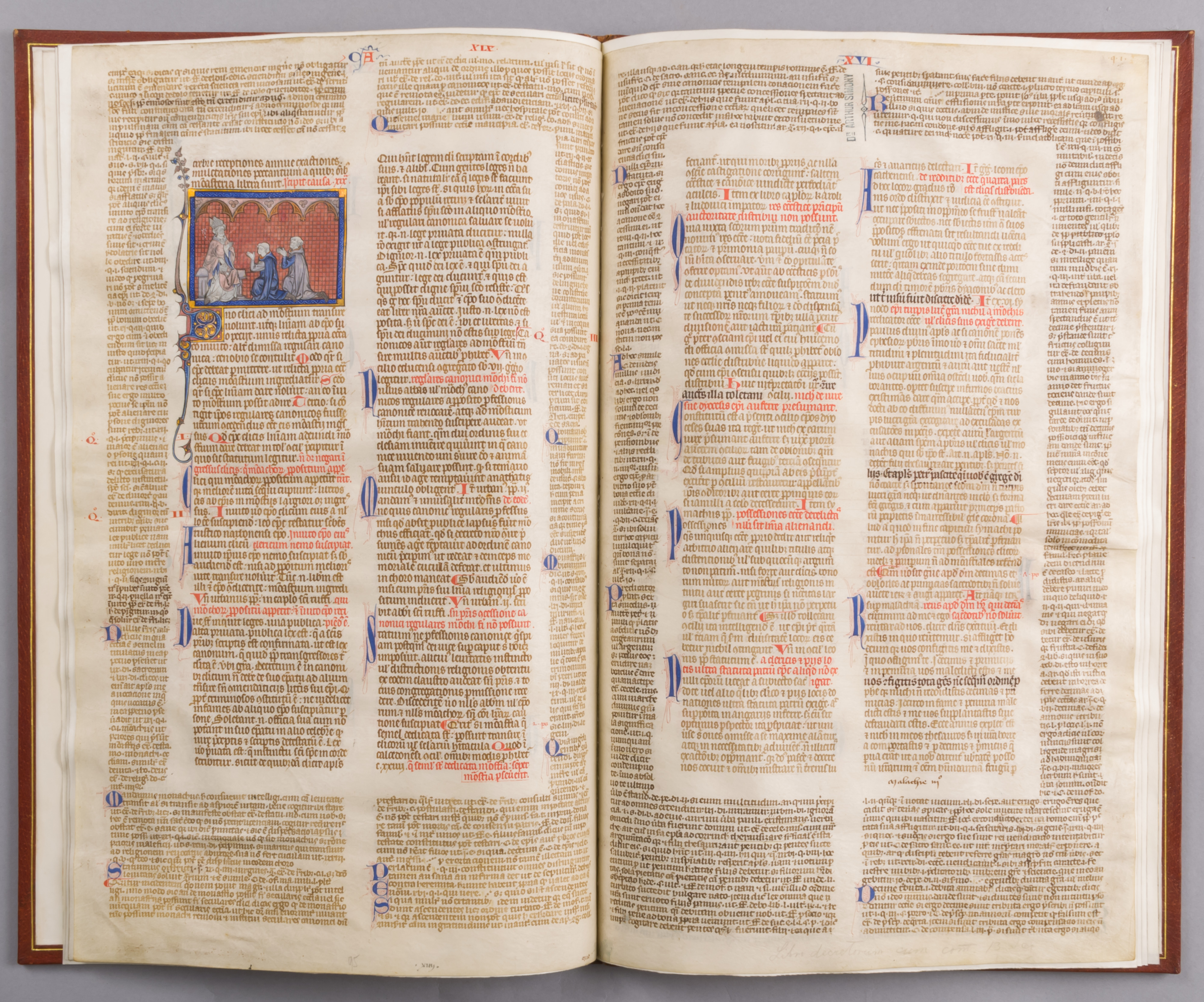
Bifolium with the decretals of gratian; circa 1290; tempera and gold on parchment, brown ink, and modern leather binding; overall: 48.3 x 29.2 x 1.3 cm, opened: 47.2 cm; Metropolitan Museum of Art

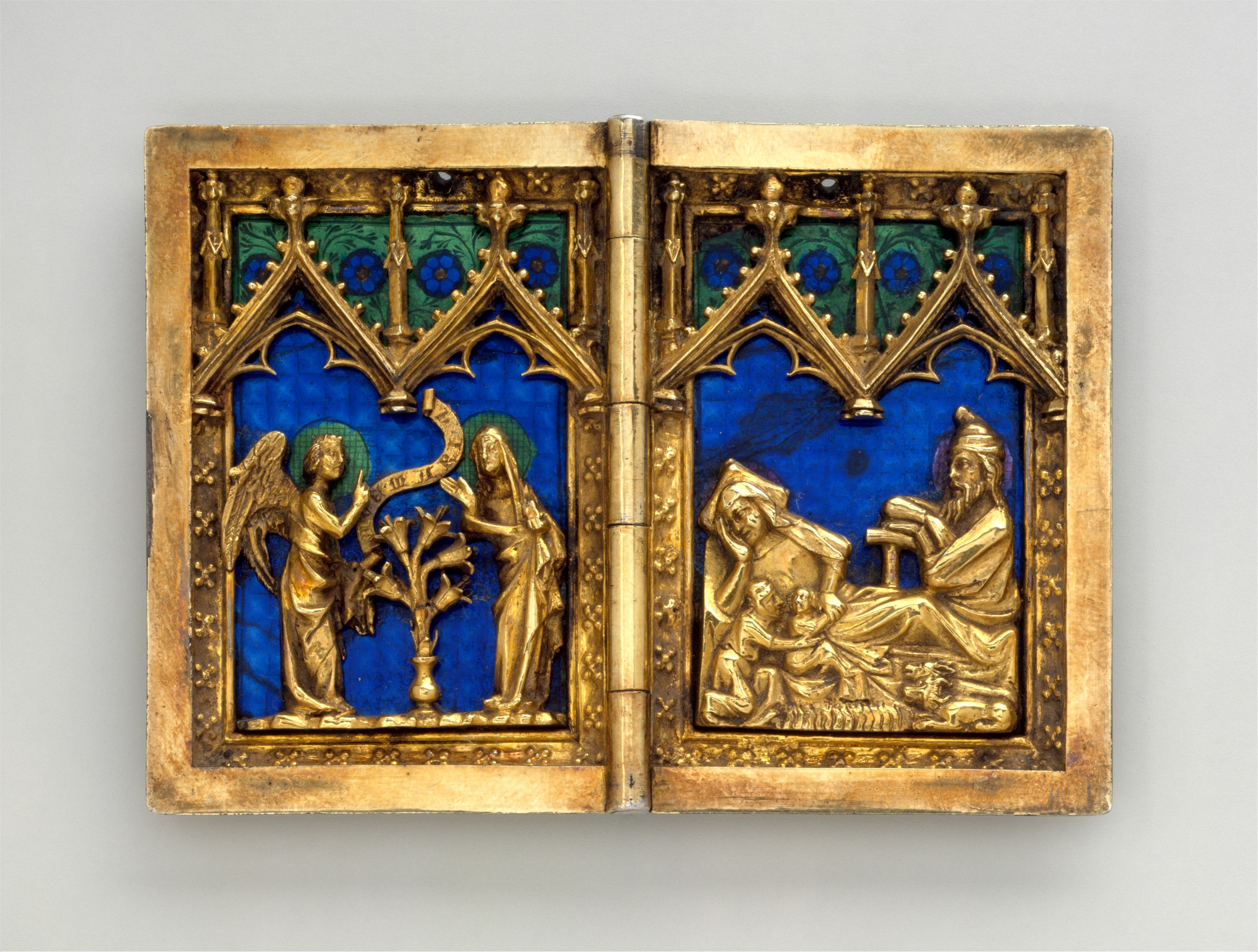
German diptych with religious scenes; 1300–1325; silver gilt with translucent and opaque enamels; overall (opened): 6.1 x 8.6 x 0.8 cm; Metropolitan Museum of Art

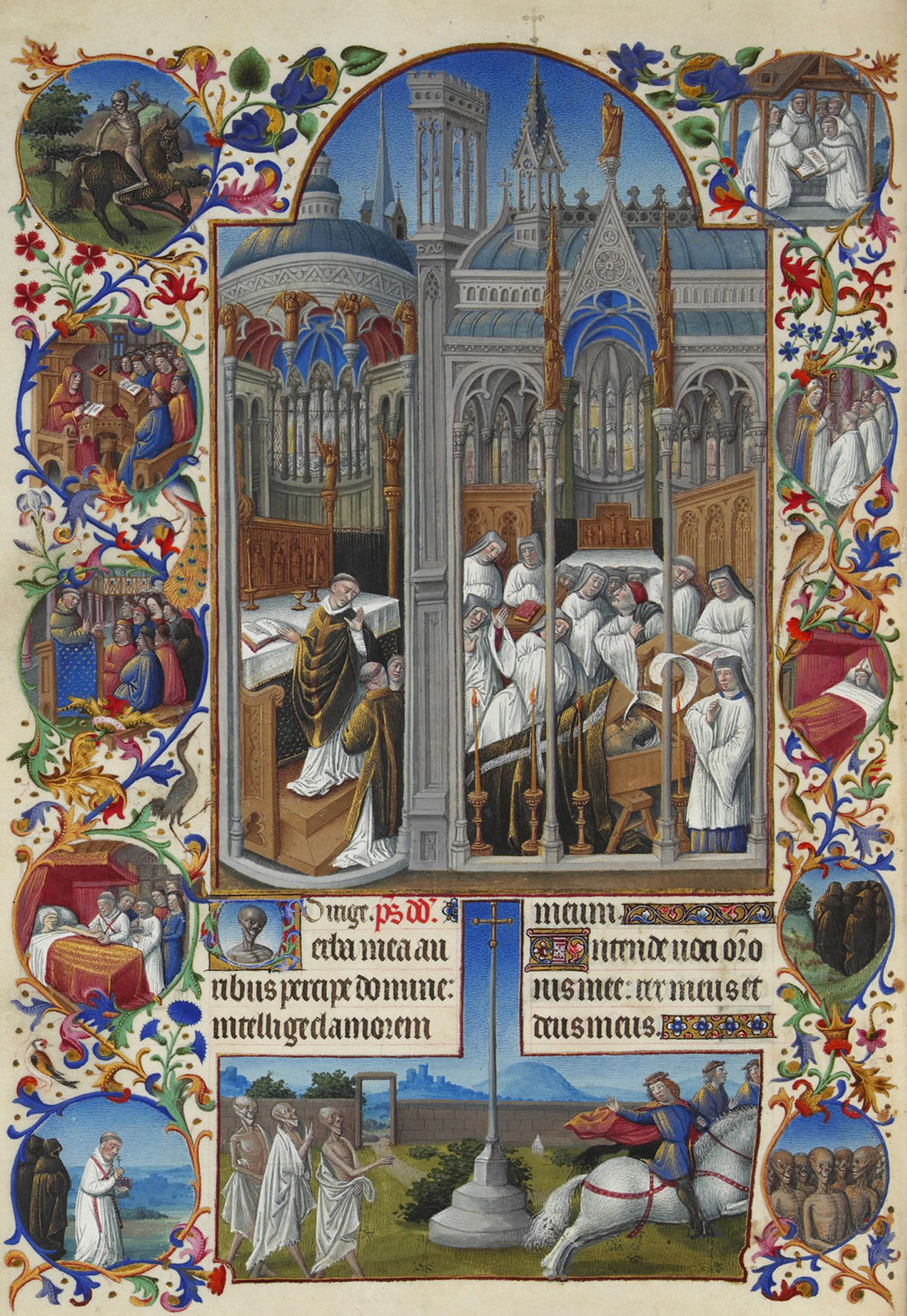
Page of Très Riches Heures du Duc de Berry depictic the funeral of Raymond Diocrès; 1411-1416 and 1485–1486; tempera on vellum; height: 29 cm, width: 21 cm; Condé Museum (Chantilly, France)

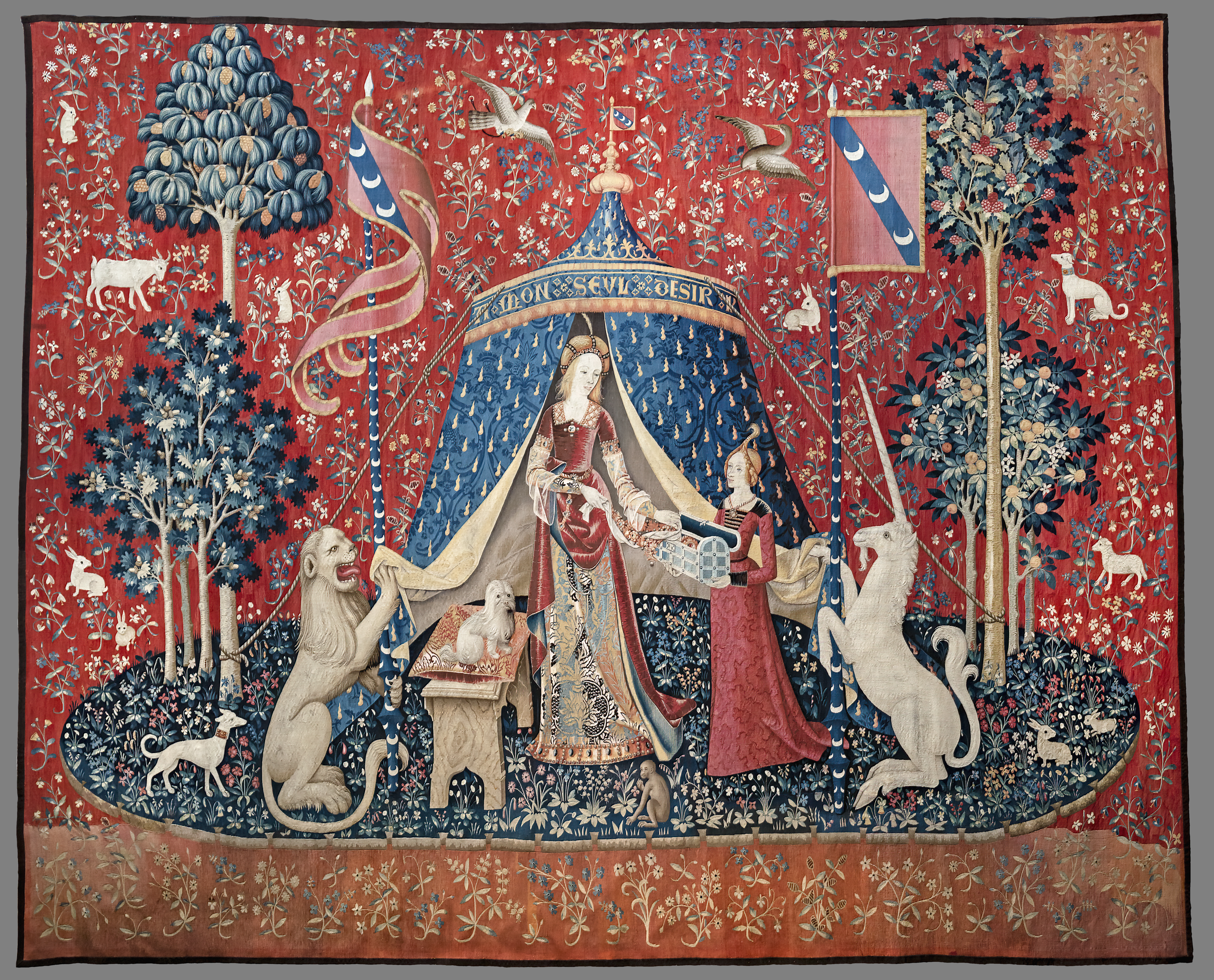
The Lady and the Unicorn, the title given to a series of six tapestries woven in Flanders, this one being called À Mon Seul Désir; late 15th century; wool and silk; 377 x 473 cm; Musée de Cluny (Paris)

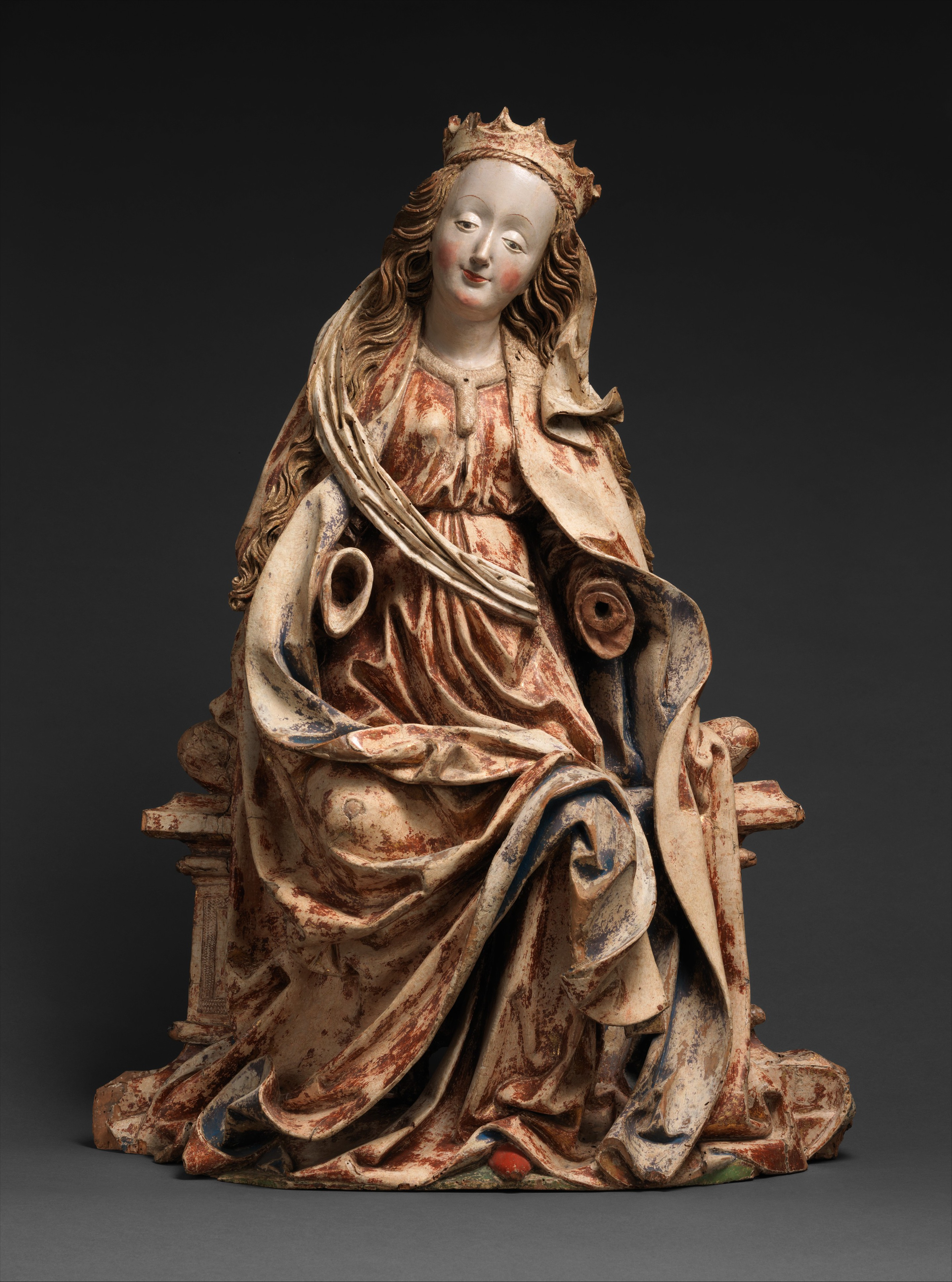
Austrian statue of Enthroned Virgin; 1490–1500; limestone with gesso, painted and gilded; 80.3 x 59.1 x 23.5 cm; Metropolitan Museum of Art

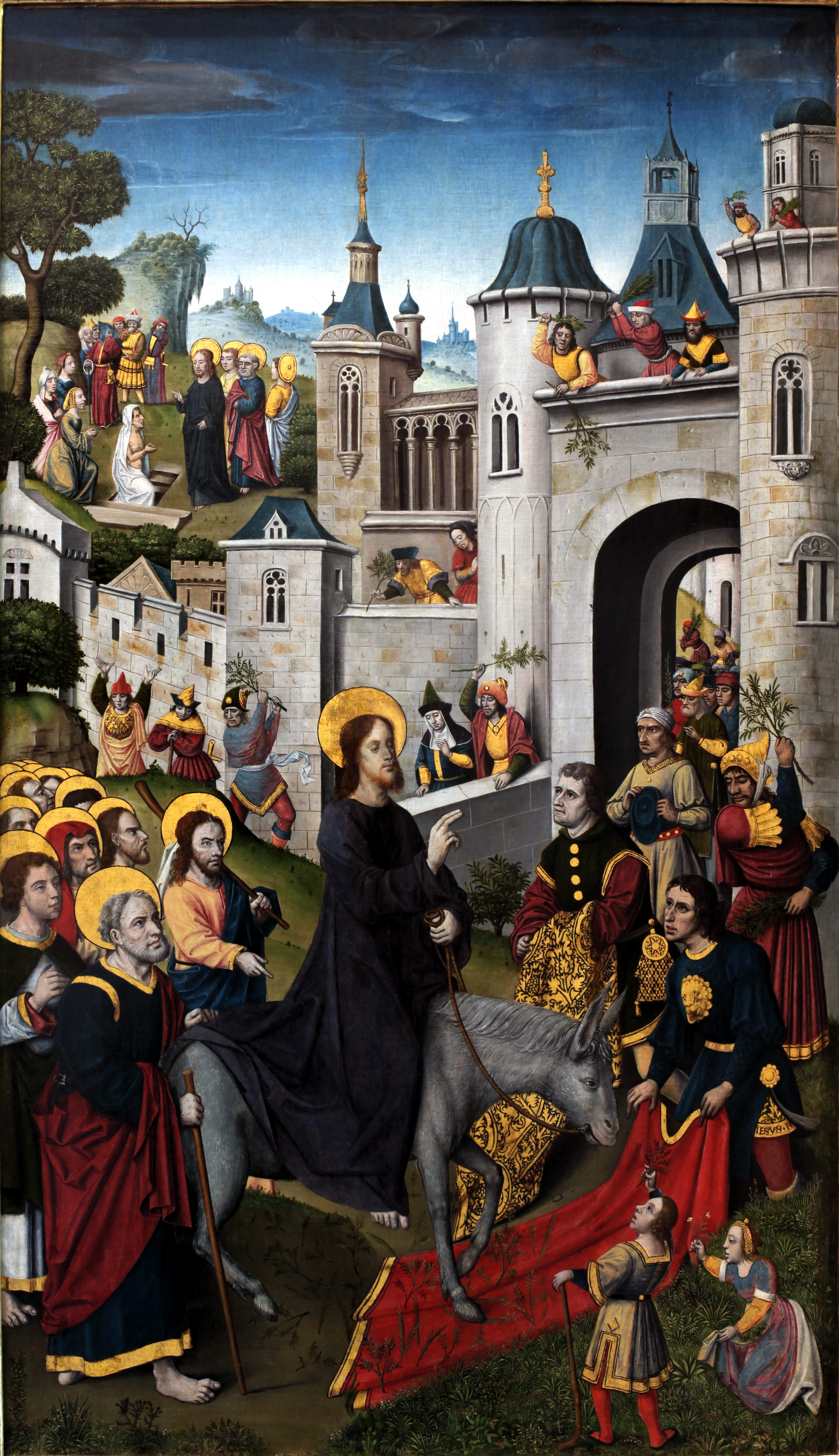
Entrance in Jerusalem; circa 1500; painting; Museum of Fine Arts of Lyon (Lyon, France)

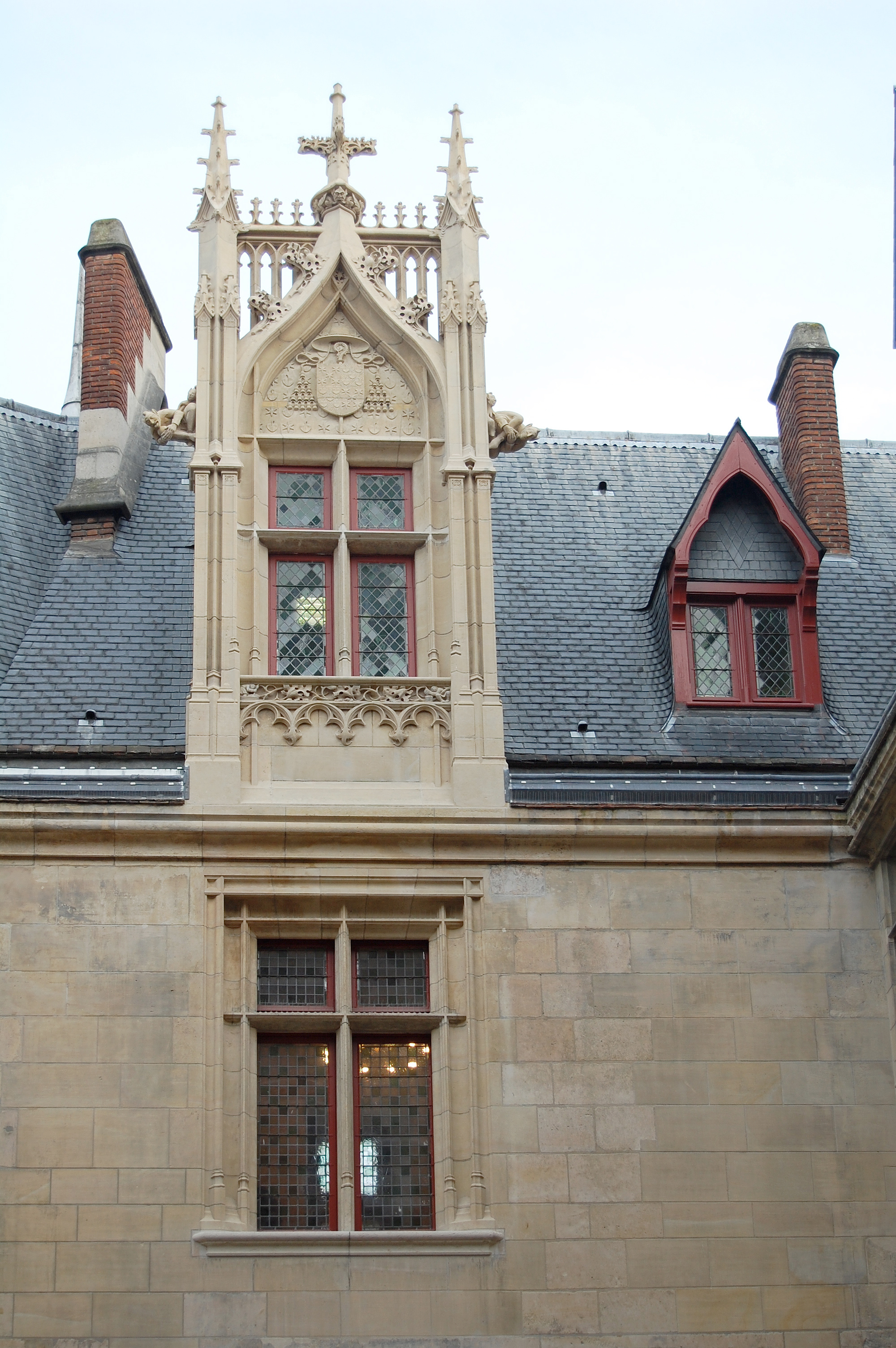
Flamboyant Gothic cross-windows of the Hôtel de Sens (Paris)

== Renaissance ==
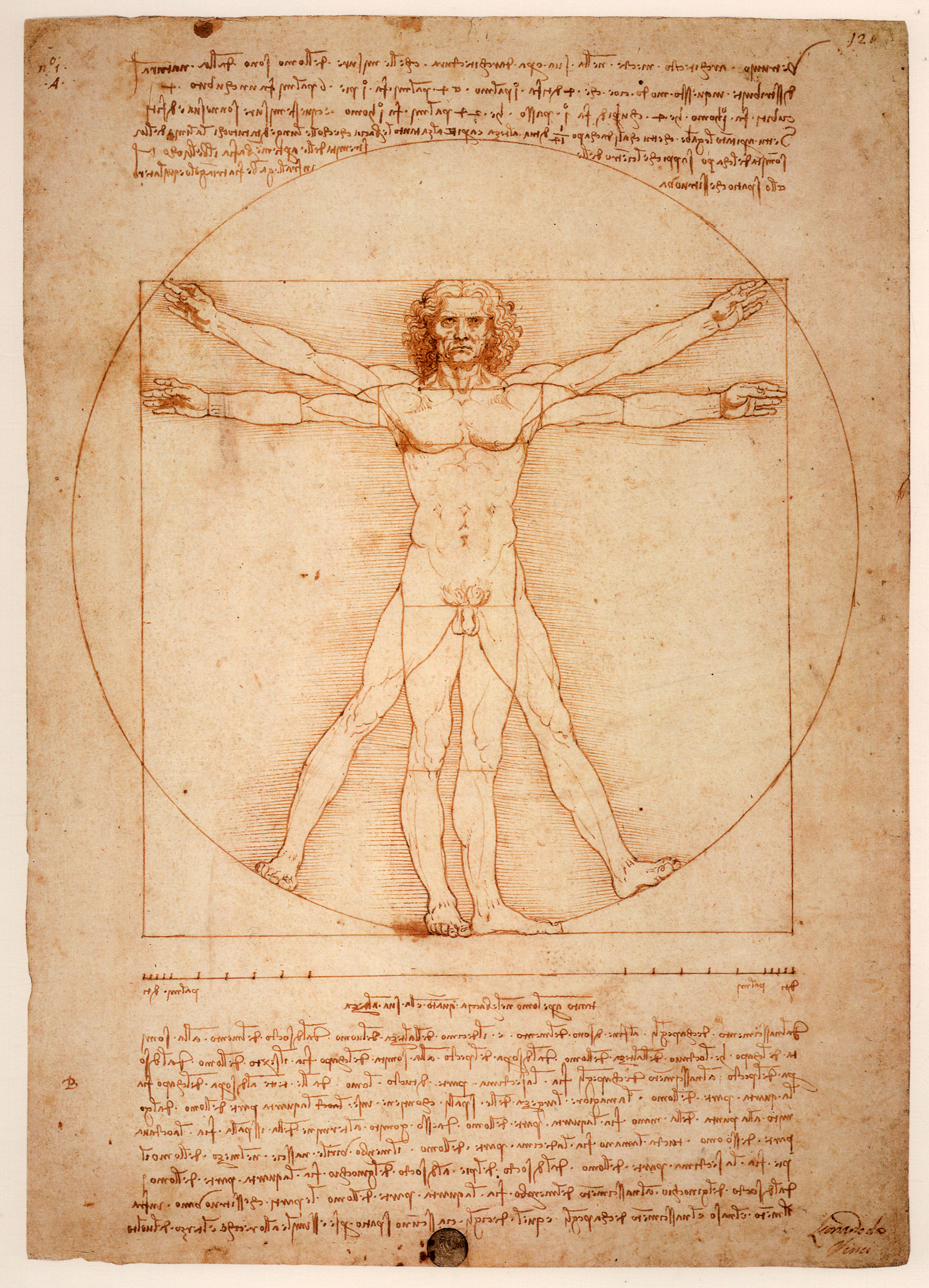
Leonardo da Vinci's Vitruvian Man (Uomo Vitruviano) (c. 1490), a seminal work from the Renaissance. The drawing is inspired and subsequently named after the 1st century BC Roman architect-author Vitruvius and his notions on the "ideal" human body proportions, found in his De architectura. The drawing highlights the movement's fascination with Graeco-Roman civilisations and appropriation of classical art, as well as his pursuit for the correlation between body structure and nature.

The Renaissance is characterized by a focus on the arts of Ancient Greece and Rome, which led to many changes in both the technical aspects of painting and sculpture and in their subject matter. It began in Italy, a country rich in Roman heritage and material prosperity to fund artists. During the Renaissance, painters began to enhance the realism of their work by using new techniques in perspective, thus representing three dimensions more authentically. Artists also began to use new techniques in manipulating light and shadow, such as the tonal contrast evident in many of Titian's portraits and the development of sfumato and chiaroscuro by Leonardo da Vinci. Sculptors, too, began to rediscover many ancient techniques such as contrapposto. Following the humanist spirit of the age, art became more secular in subject matter, depicting ancient mythology alongside Christian themes. This genre of art is often referred to as Renaissance Classicism. In the North, the most important Renaissance innovation was the widespread use of oil paints, which allowed for greater colour and intensity.

=== From Gothic to the Renaissance ===
During the late 13th century and early 14th century, much of the painting in Italy was Byzantine in character, notably that of Duccio of Siena and Cimabue of Florence, while Pietro Cavallini in Rome was more Gothic in style. During the 13th century, Italian sculptors began to draw inspiration not only from medieval prototypes, but also from ancient works.

In 1290, Giotto began painting in a manner that was less traditional and more based upon observation of nature. His famous cycle at the Scrovegni Chapel, Padua, is seen as the beginning of a Renaissance style.

Other painters of the 14th century carried the Gothic style to great elaboration and detail. Notable among these painters are Simone Martini and Gentile da Fabriano.

In the Netherlands, the technique of painting in oils rather than tempera, lent itself to a form of elaboration that was not dependent upon the application of gold leaf and embossing, but upon the minute depiction of the natural world. The art of painting textures with great realism evolved at this time. Dutch painters such as Jan van Eyck and Hugo van der Goes were to have a great influence on Late Gothic and Early Renaissance painting.

=== Early Renaissance ===
The ideas of the Renaissance first emerged in the city-state of Florence, Italy. The sculptor Donatello returned to classical techniques such as contrapposto and classical subjects like the unsupported nude—his second sculpture of David was the first free-standing bronze nude created in Europe since the Roman Empire. The sculptor and architect Brunelleschi studied the architectural ideas of ancient Roman buildings for inspiration. Masaccio perfected elements like composition, individual expression, and human form to paint frescoes, especially those in the Brancacci Chapel, of surprising elegance, drama, and emotion.

A remarkable number of these major artists worked on different portions of the Florence Cathedral. Brunelleschi's dome for the cathedral was one of the first truly revolutionary architectural innovations since the Gothic flying buttress. Donatello created many of its sculptures. Giotto and Lorenzo Ghiberti also contributed to the cathedral.

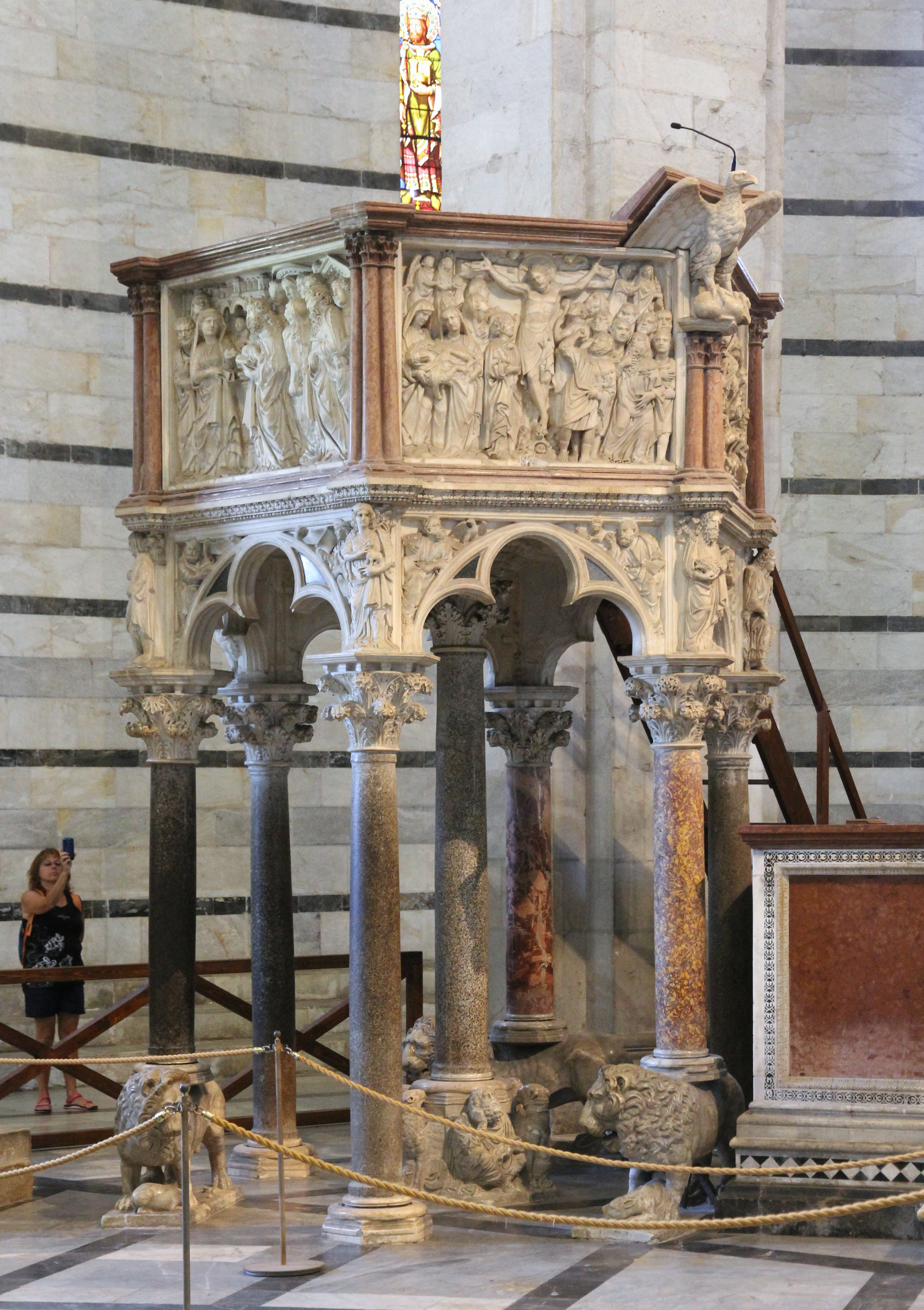
Pulpit in the Pisa Baptistery by Nicola Pisano; 1260; marble; height: 4.6 m.

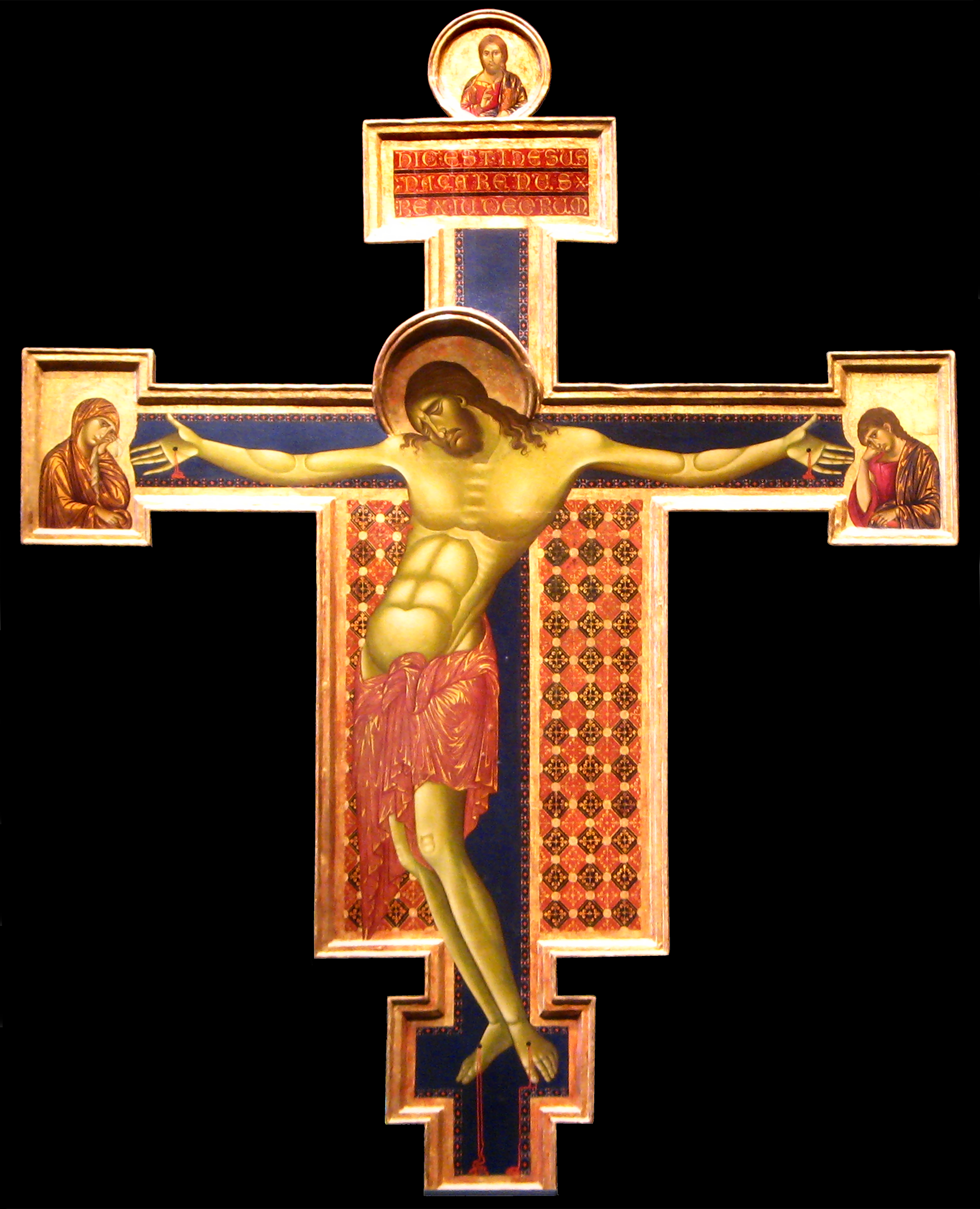
Crucifix; by Cimabue; circa 1285; tempera on panel; 4.29 x 3.83 m; San Domenico (Arezzo, Italy)

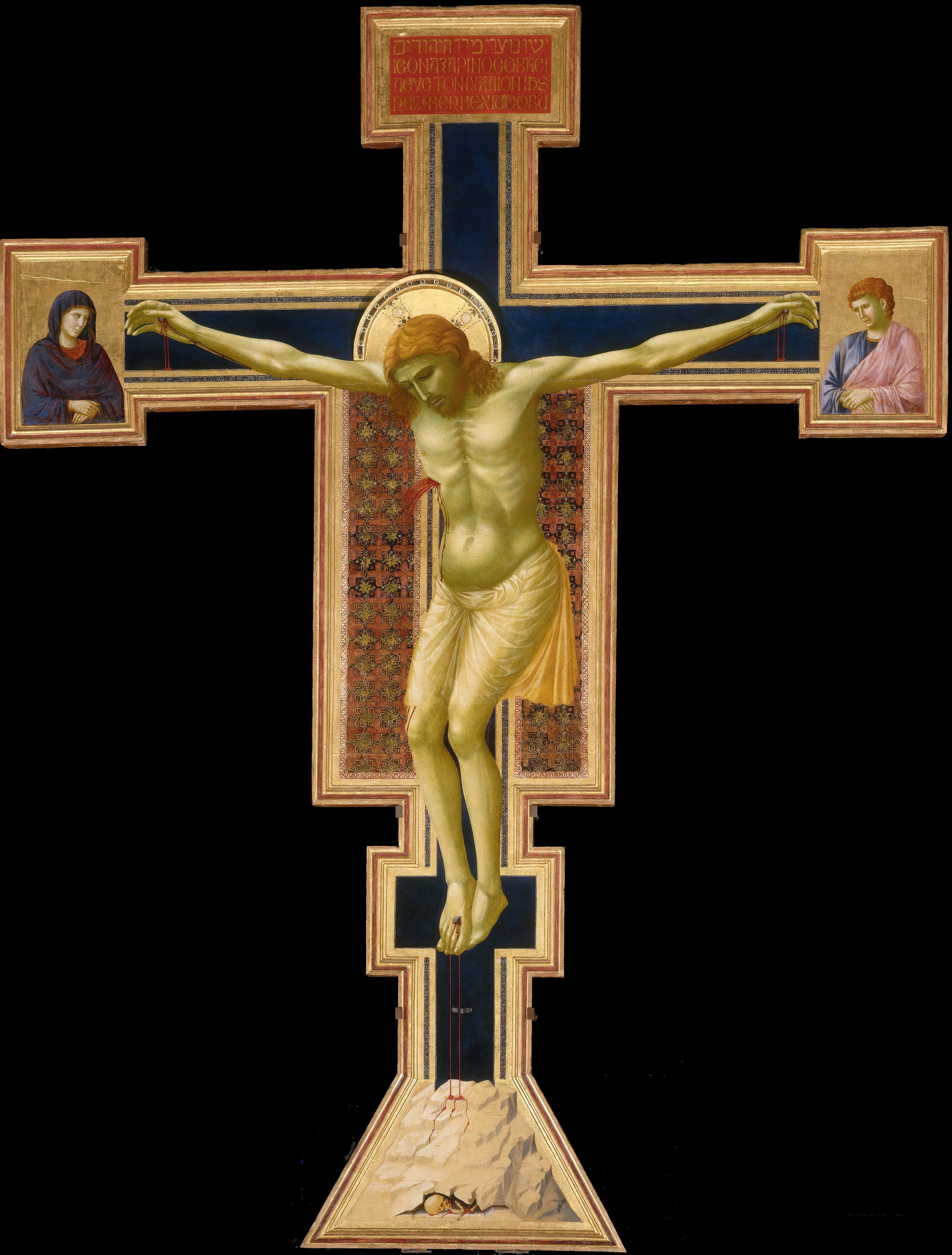
Crucifix; Giotto; circa 1300; tempera on panel; 5.78 x 4.06 m; Santa Maria Novella (Florence, Italy)

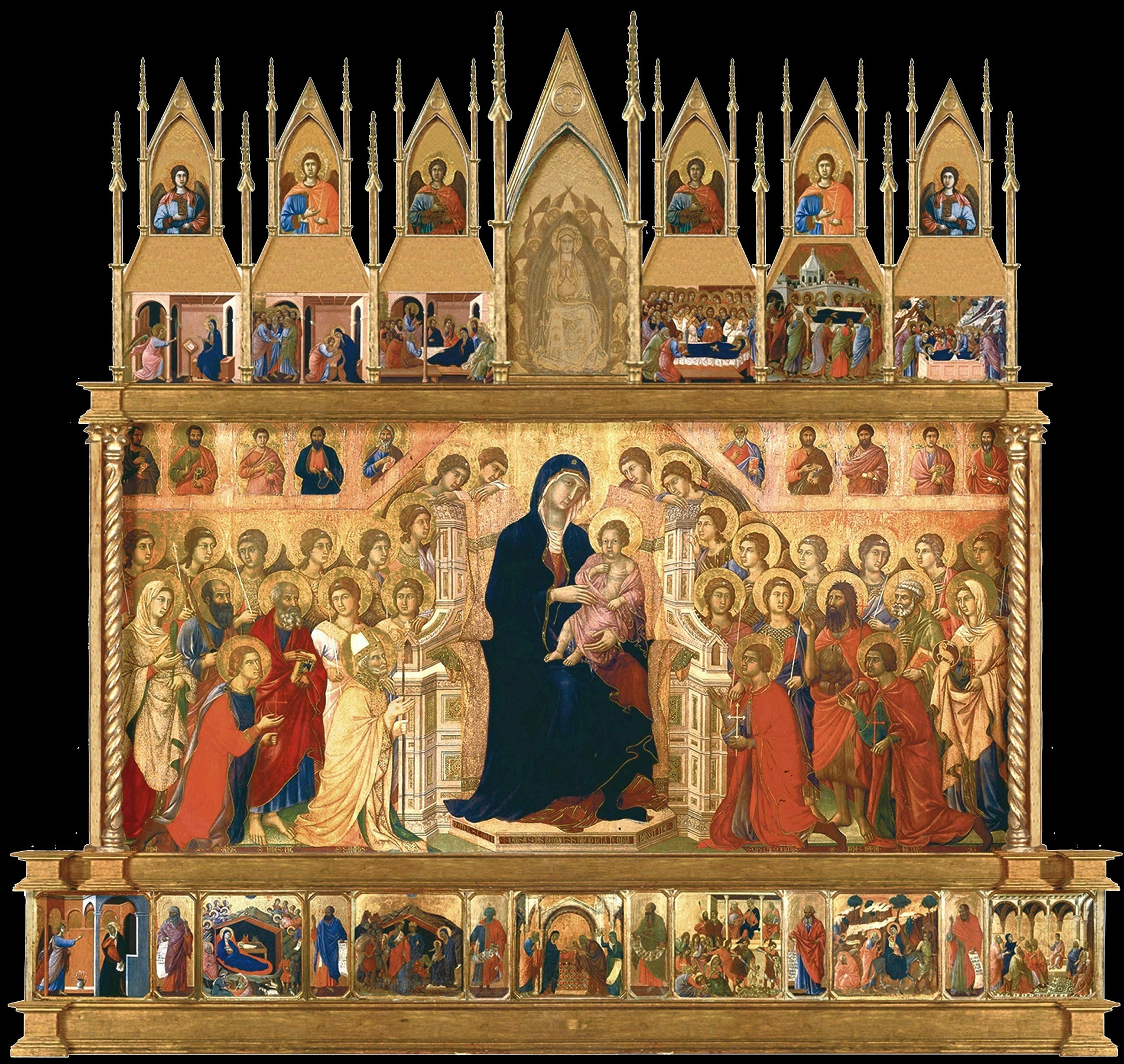
The Maestà Altarpiece; by Duccio; 1308–1311; tempera on panel; 2.46 x 4.67 m; Museo dell'Opera del Duomo (Siena, Italy)

=== High Renaissance ===
High Renaissance artists include such figures as Leonardo da Vinci, Michelangelo Buonarroti, and Raffaello Sanzio.

The 15th-century artistic developments in Italy (for example, the interest in perspectival systems, in depicting anatomy, and in classical cultures) matured during the 16th century, accounting for the designations "Early Renaissance" for the 15th century and "High Renaissance" for the 16th century. Although no singular style characterizes the High Renaissance, the art of those most closely associated with this period—Leonardo da Vinci, Raphael, Michelangelo, and Titian—exhibits an astounding mastery, both technical and aesthetic. High Renaissance artists created works of such authority that generations of later artists relied on these artworks for instruction. These exemplary artistic creations further elevated artists' prestige. Artists could claim divine inspiration, thereby raising visual art to a status once reserved for poetry. Thus, painters, sculptors, and architects came into their own, successfully claiming a high position for their work among the fine arts. In a sense, 16th- century masters created a new profession with its own rights of expression and its own venerable character.

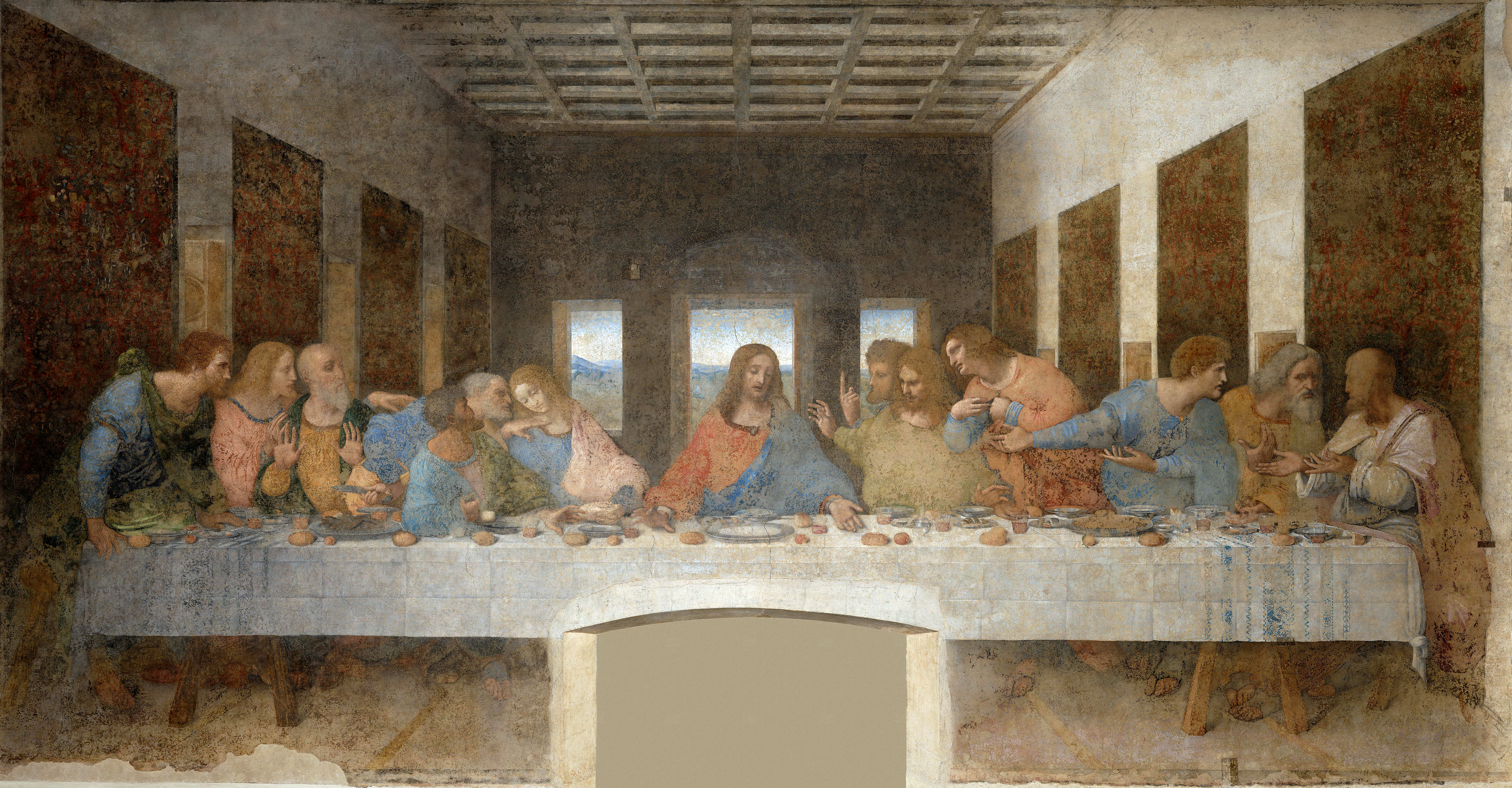
The Last Supper (1494–1499), Leonardo da Vinci, Church of Santa Maria delle Grazie, Milan

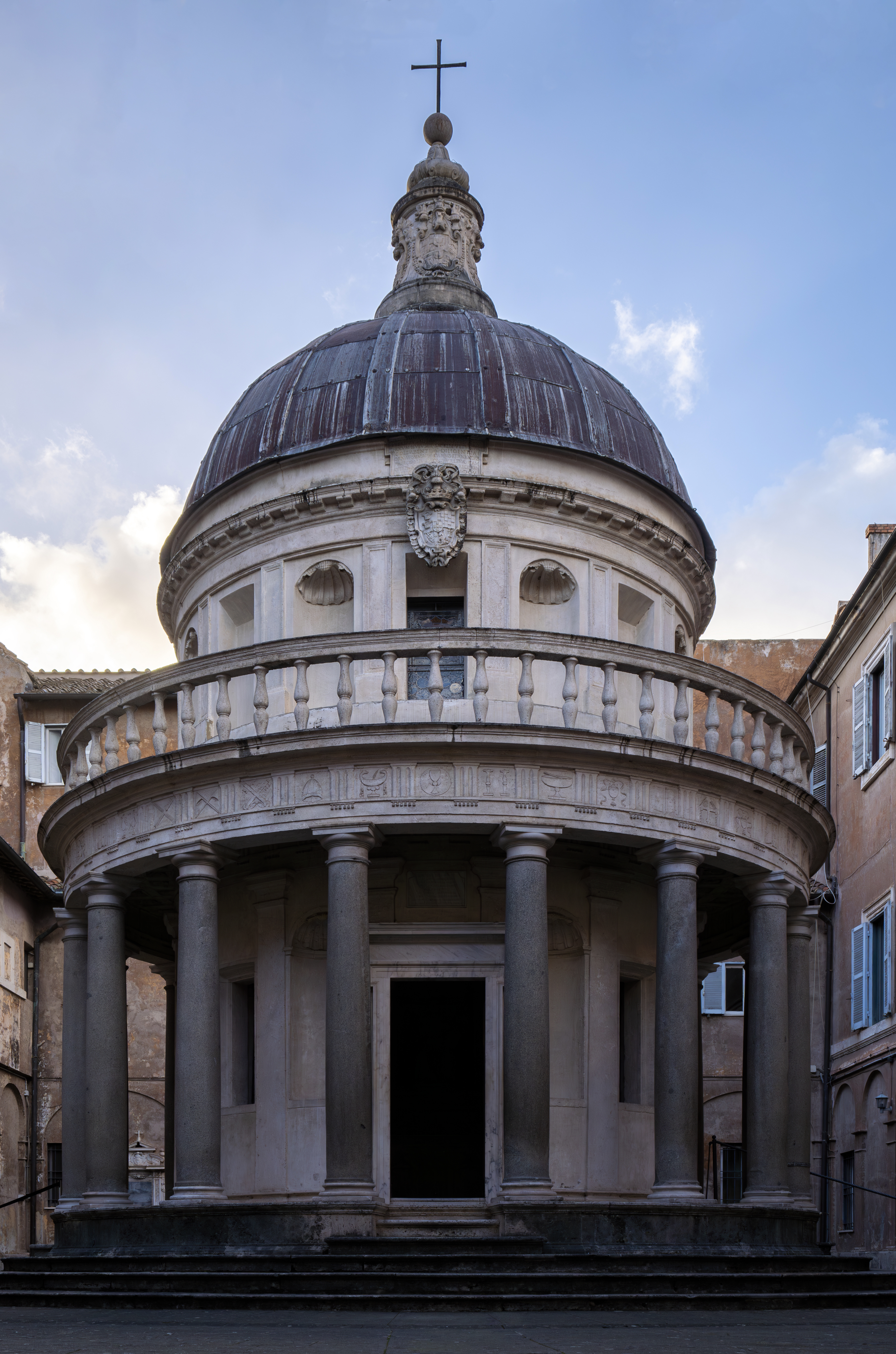
The Tempietto (towards 1502–1510) in a narrow courtyard of the San Pietro in Montorio from Rome

The Birth of Venus (1484–1486), Sandro Botticelli, Uffizi Gallery, Florence

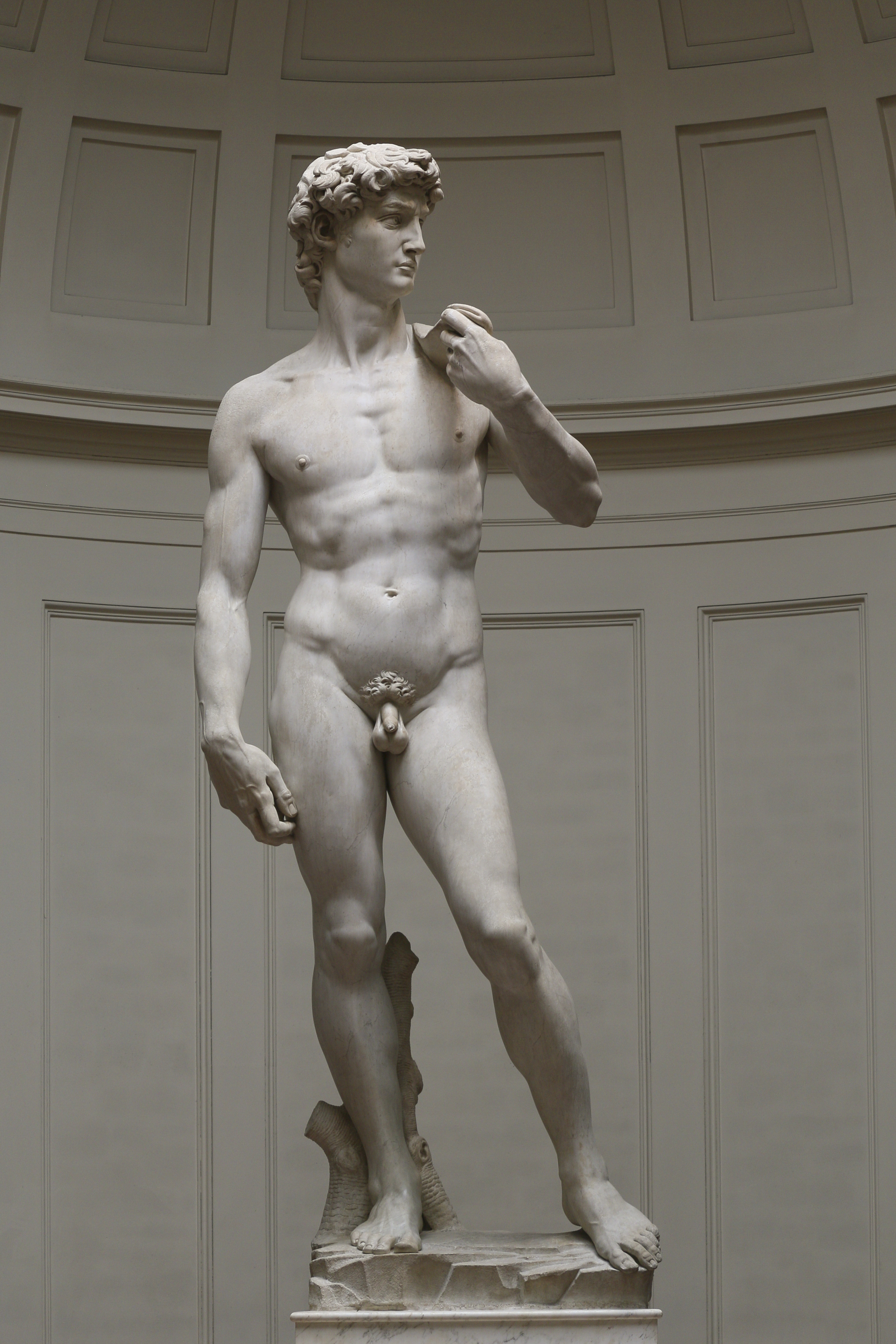
David; by Michelangelo; 1501–1504; marble; 517 cm × 199 cm; Galleria dell'Accademia (Florence)

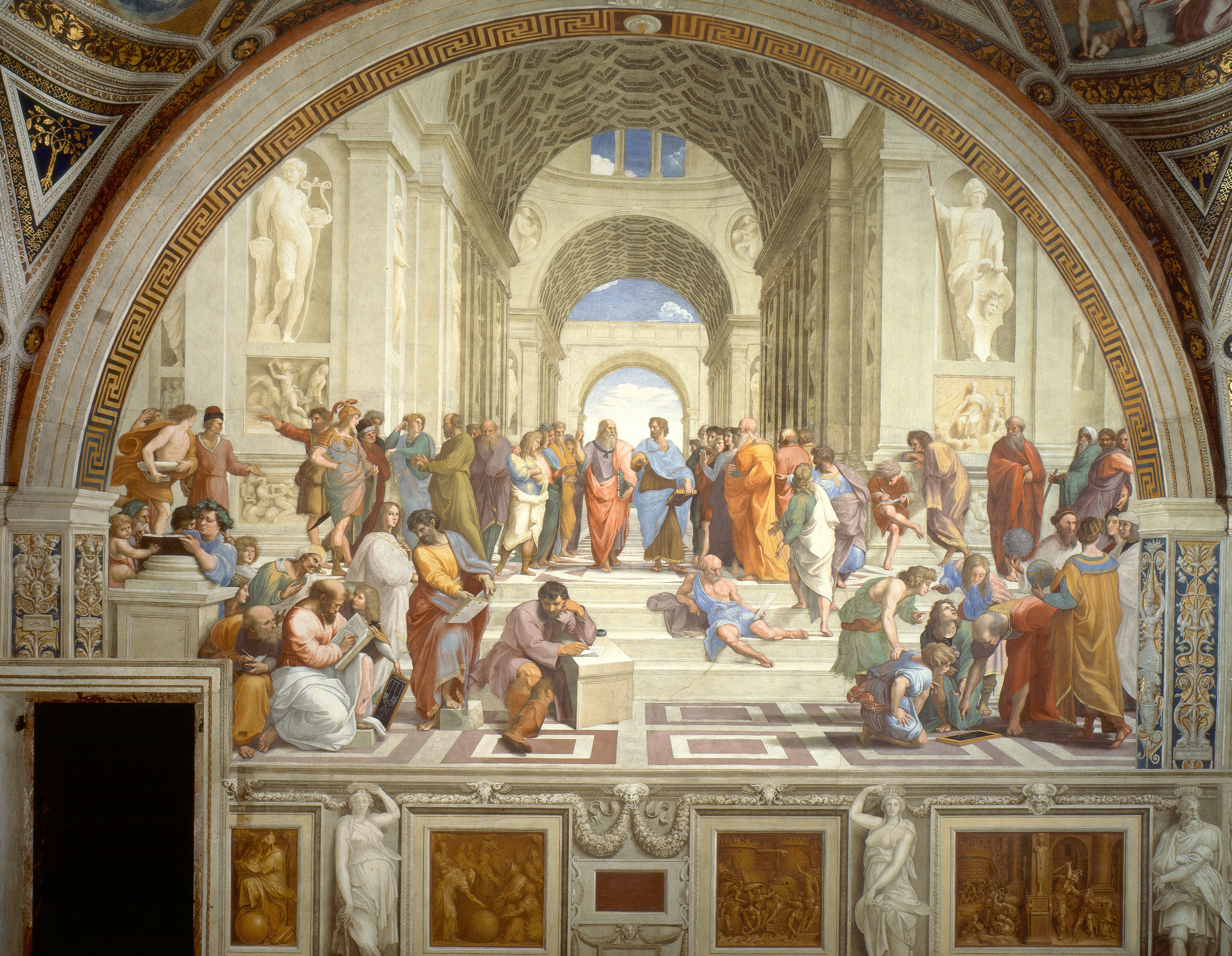
The School of Athens; by Raphael; 1509–1510; fresco; 5.8 x 8.2 m; Apostolic Palace (Vatican City)

=== Northern art up to the Renaissance ===
Early Netherlandish painting developed (but did not strictly invent) the technique of oil painting to allow greater control in painting minute detail with realism—Jan van Eyck (1366–1441) was a figure in the movement from illuminated manuscripts to panel paintings.

Hieronymus Bosch (1450?–1516), a Dutch painter, is another important figure in the Northern Renaissance. He used religious themes, but combined them with grotesque fantasies, colorful imagery, and peasant folk legends. His paintings often reflect the confusion and anguish associated with the end of the Middle Ages.

Albrecht Dürer introduced Italian Renaissance style to Germany at the end of the 15th century, and dominated German Renaissance art.

Time Period:

- Italian Renaissance: Late 14th century to Early 16th century
- Northern Renaissance: 16th century
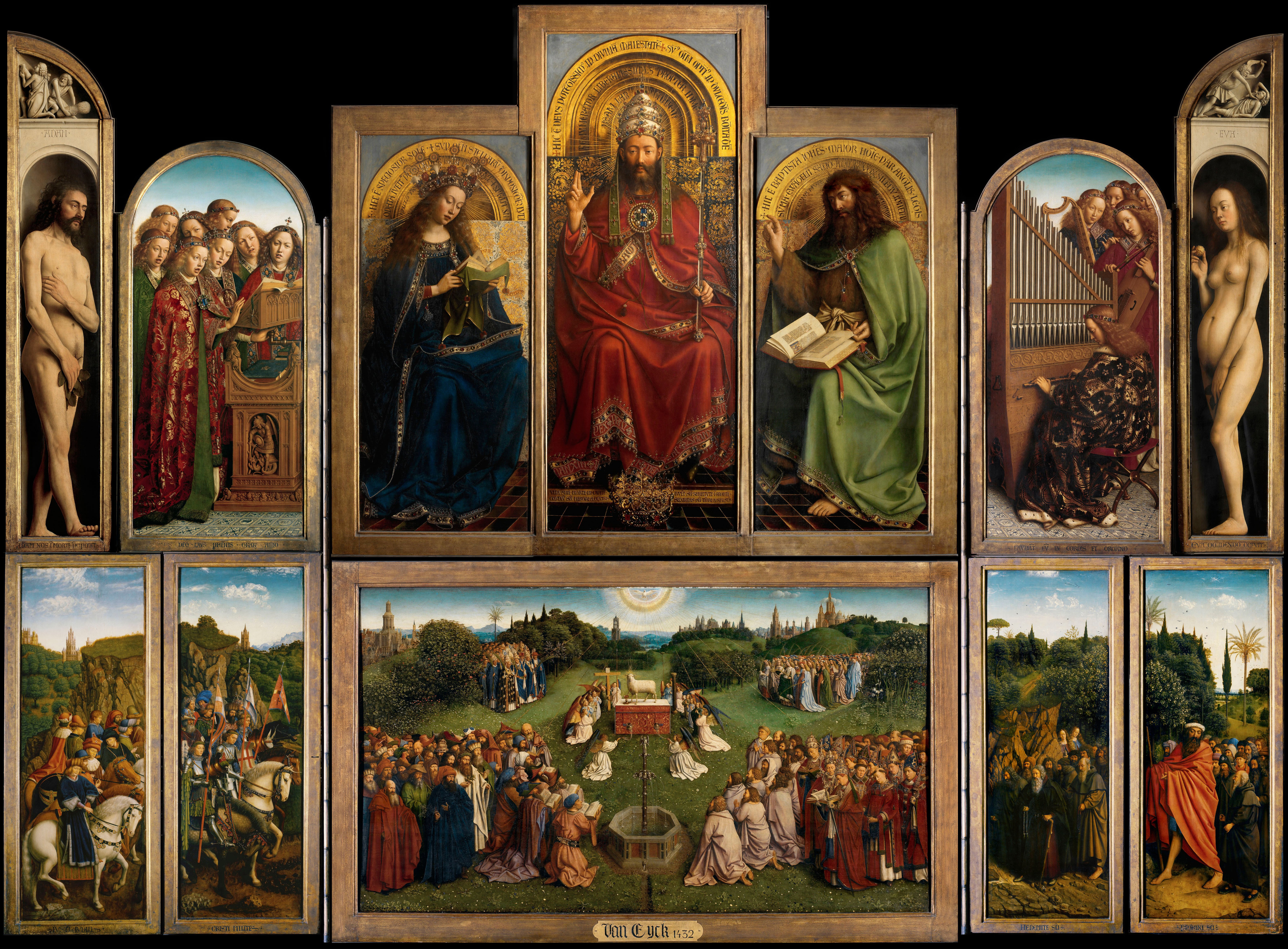
The Ghent Altarpiece; by Jan and Hubert van Eyck; 1432; oil on oak wood; 3.4 m × 4.6 m (opened like in this image); St Bavo's Cathedral (Ghent, Belgium)

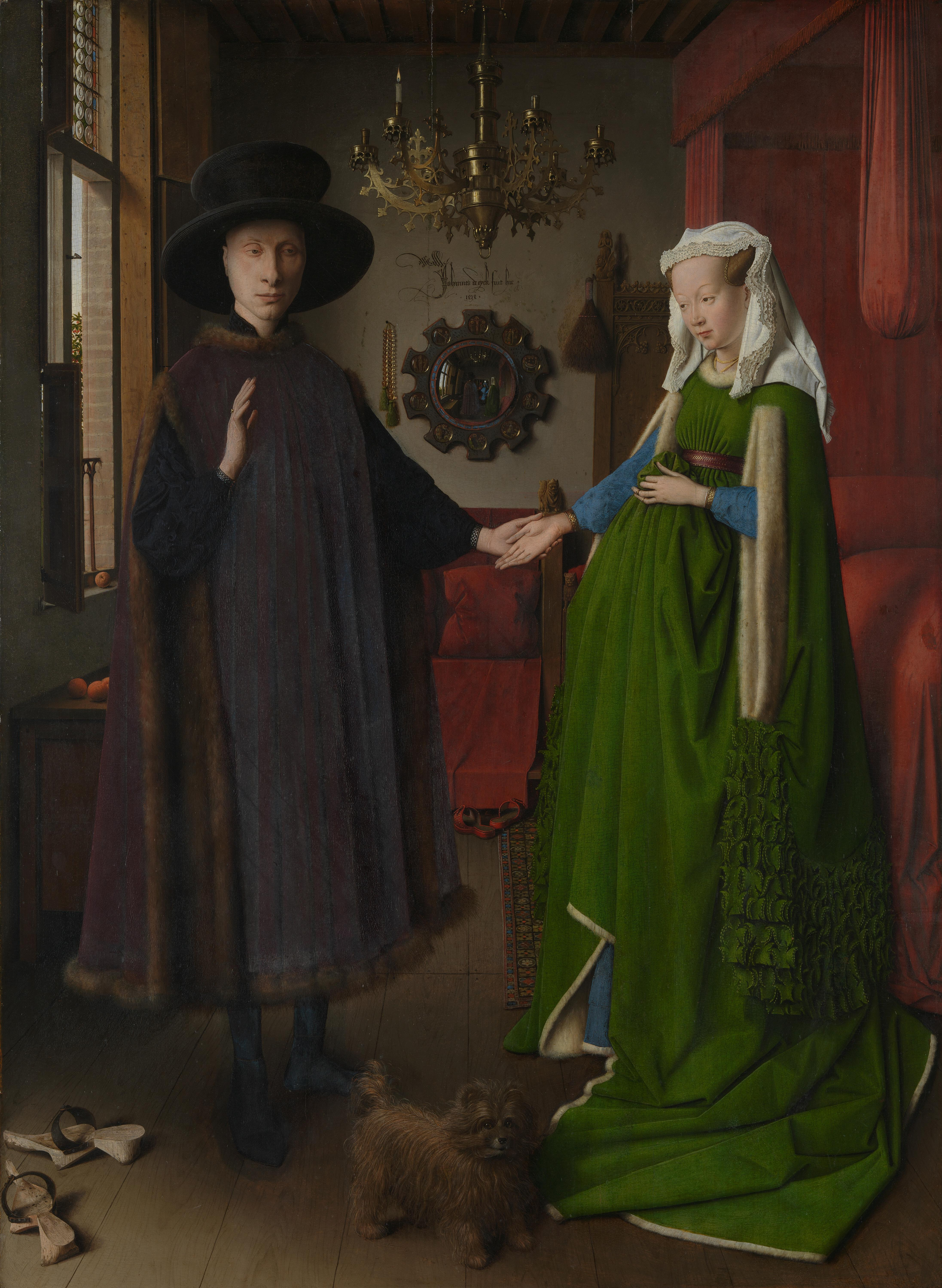
The Arnolfini Portrait; by Jan van Eyck; 1434; oil on panel; 82.2 x 60 cm; National Gallery (London)

The Descent from the Cross; by Rogier van der Weyden; circa 1442; oil on oak panel; 220 × 262 cm; Museo del Prado (Madrid, Spain)

The Garden of Earthly Delights; by Hieronymus Bosch; c. 1504; oil on panel; 2.2 × 1.95 m – the central panel; Museo del Prado

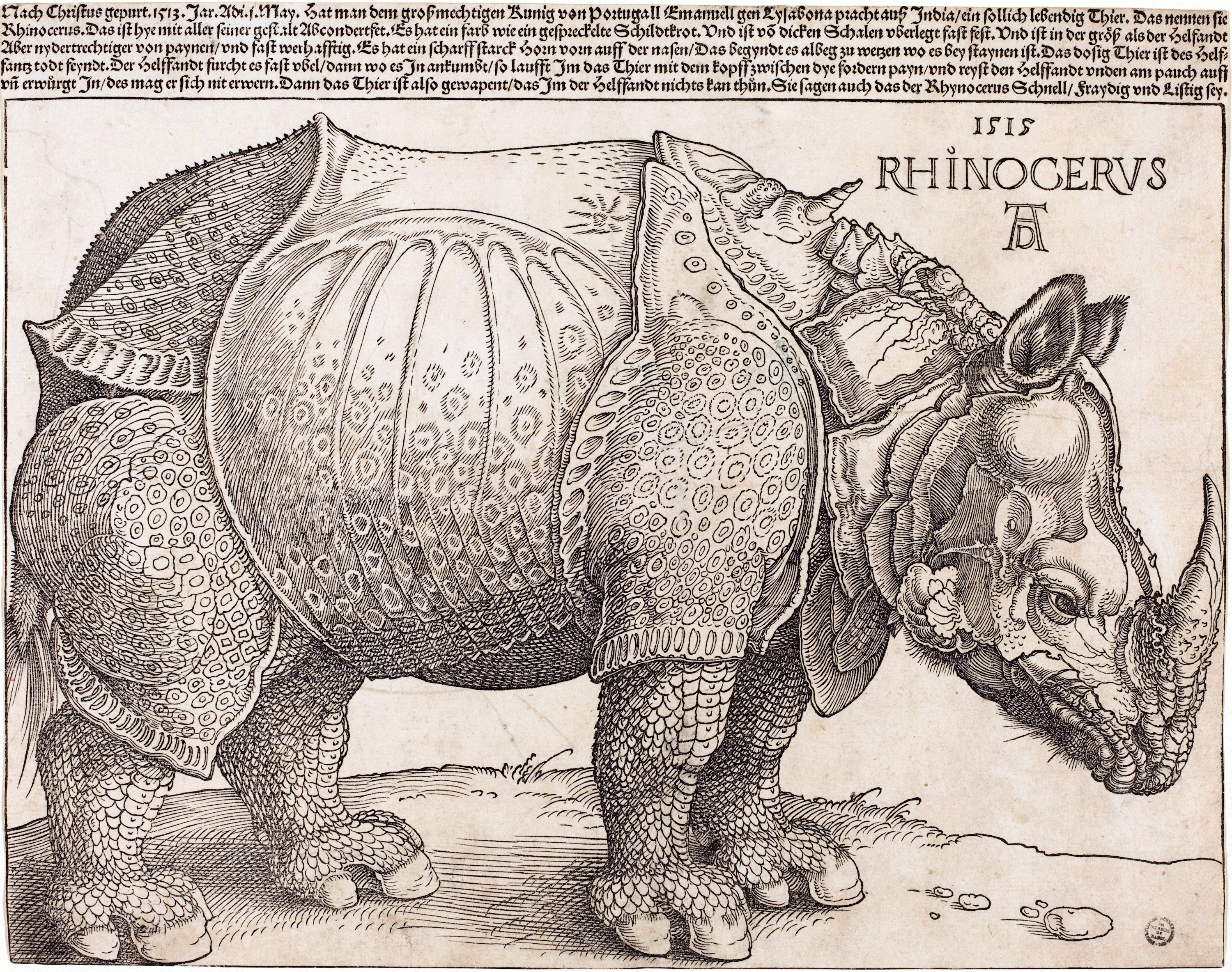
The Rhinoceros; by Albrecht Dürer; 1515; woodcut; 23.5 cm × 29.8 cm; National Gallery of Art (Washington, D.C.)

The Ambassadors; by Hans Holbein the Younger; 1533; oil on panel; 2.07 × 2.09; National Gallery (London)

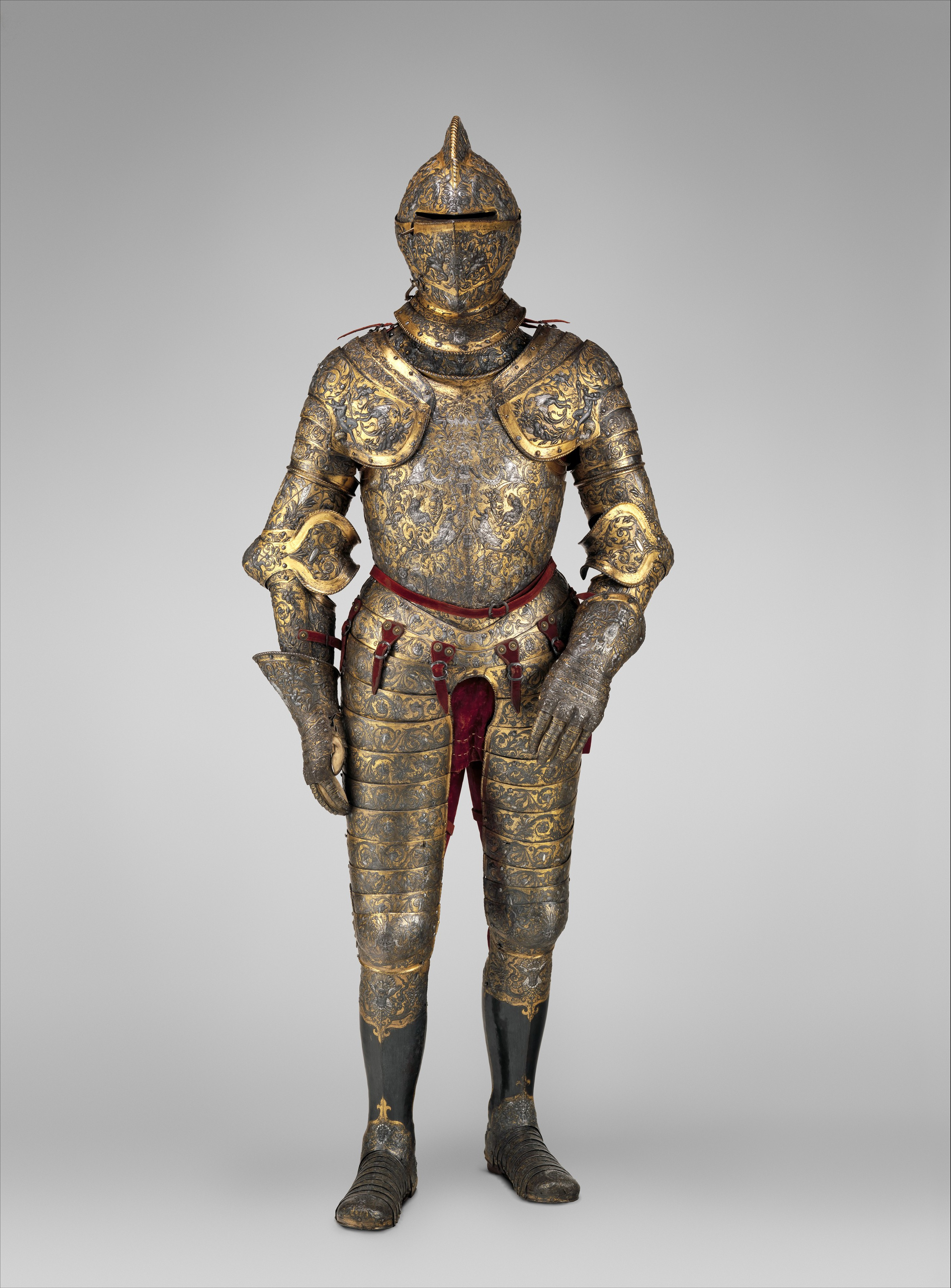
The Parade Armour of Henry II of France; by Étienne Delaune; circa 1555; Metropolitan Museum of Art (New York City)

The Tower of Babel; by Pieter Bruegel the Elder; 1563; oil on panel: 1.14 × 1.55 cm; Kunsthistorisches Museum (Vienna, Austria)

== Mannerism, Baroque, and Rococo ==
Differences between Baroque and Rococo art

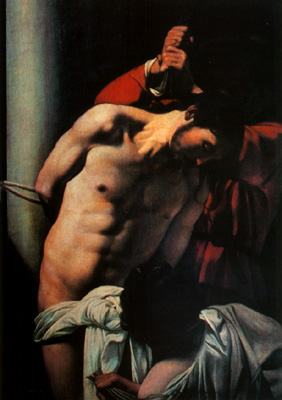
Baroque art was characterised by strongly religious and political themes; common characteristics included rich colours with a strong light and dark contrast. Paintings were elaborate, emotional, and dramatic. In the image Caravaggio's Christ at the Column (Cristo alla colonna)

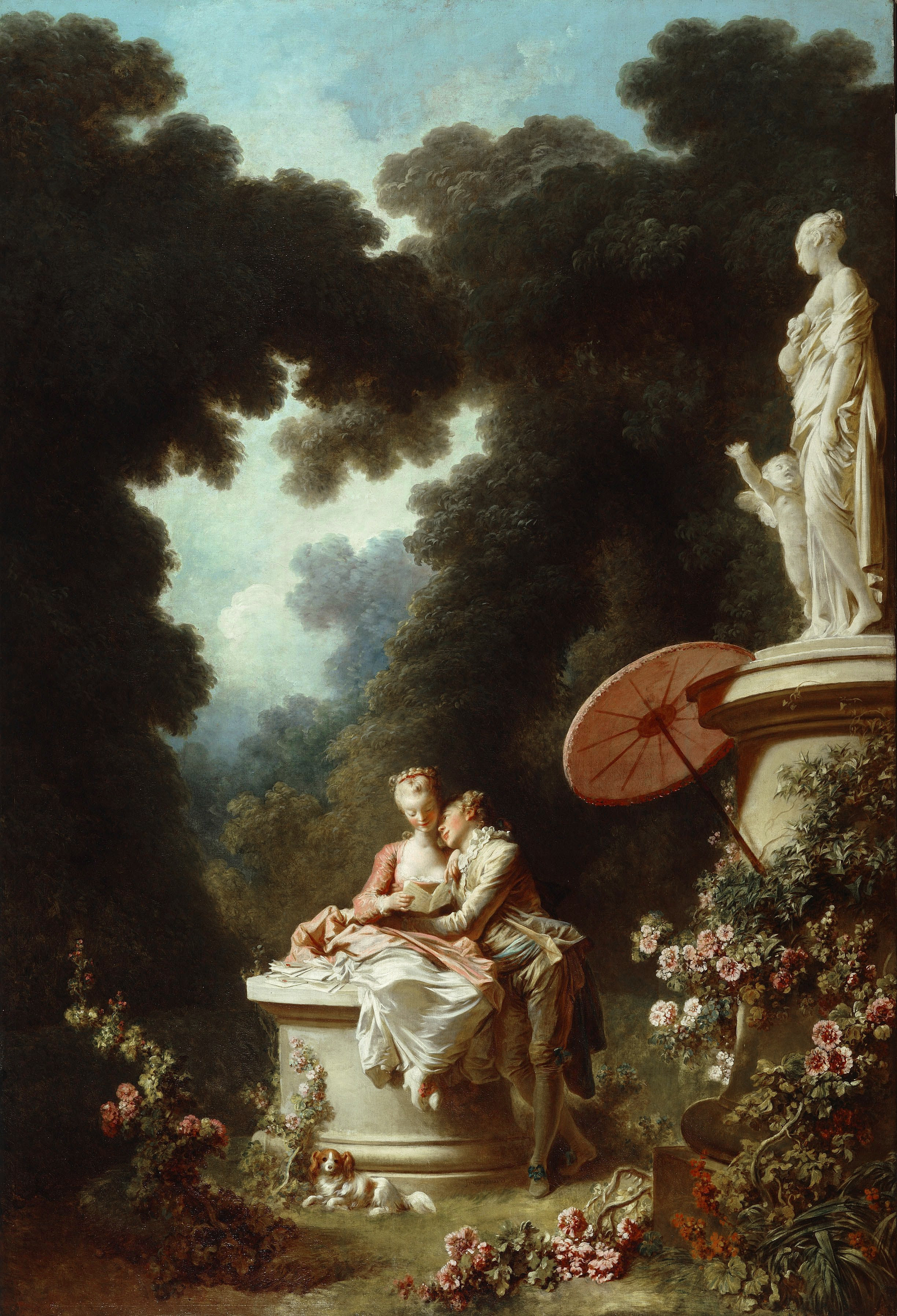
Rococo art was characterised by lighter, often jocular themes; common characteristics included pale, creamy colours, florid decorations, and a penchant for bucolic landscapes. Paintings were more ornate than their Baroque counterpart, and usually graceful, playful, and light-hearted in nature.

In European art, Renaissance Classicism gave rise to two movements—Mannerism and the Baroque. Mannerism, a reaction against the idealist perfection of Classicism, employed distortions of light and spatial frameworks to emphasize the emotional content of a painting and the emotions of the painter. The work of El Greco is a particularly clear example of Mannerism in painting during the late 16th and early 17th centuries. Northern Mannerism took longer to develop and was largely a movement of the last half of the 16th century. Baroque art took the representationalism of the Renaissance to new heights, emphasizing detail, movement, lighting, and drama in its search for beauty. Perhaps the best known Baroque painters are Caravaggio, Rembrandt, Peter Paul Rubens, and Diego Velázquez.

A rather different art developed out of northern realist traditions in 17th-century Dutch Golden Age painting, which had very little religious art, and little history painting, instead playing a crucial part in developing secular genres such as still life, genre paintings of everyday scenes, and landscape painting. While the Baroque nature of Rembrandt's art is clear, the label is less useful for Vermeer and many other Dutch artists. Flemish Baroque painting shared a part in this trend, while also continuing to produce the traditional categories.

Baroque art is often seen as part of the Counter-Reformation—the artistic element of the revival of spiritual life in the Roman Catholic Church. Additionally, the emphasis that Baroque art placed on grandeur is seen as Absolutist in nature. Religious and political themes were widely explored within the Baroque artistic context, and a strong element of drama, emotion, and theatricality characterised both paintings and sculptures. Famous Baroque artists include Caravaggio or Rubens. Artemisia Gentileschi was another noteworthy artist, who was inspired by Caravaggio's style. Baroque art was particularly ornate and elaborate, often using rich, warm colours with dark undertones. Pomp and grandeur were important elements of the Baroque artistic movement in general, as can be seen in Louis XIV 's saying, "I am grandeur incarnate"; many Baroque artists served kings who sought to realize this goal. Baroque art, in many ways, was similar to Renaissance art; in fact, the term was initially used in a derogatory manner to describe post-Renaissance art and architecture that was over-elaborate. Baroque art can be seen as a more elaborate and dramatic re-adaptation of late Renaissance art.

By the 18th century, however, Baroque art was falling out of fashion as many deemed it too melodramatic and gloomy, and it gave way to the Rococo, which emerged in France. Rococo art was even more elaborate than the Baroque, but it was less serious and more playful. Whilst the Baroque used rich, strong colours, Rococo used pale, creamier shades. The artistic movement no longer emphasized politics and religion, focusing instead on lighter themes such as romance, celebration, and the appreciation of nature. Rococo art also contrasted with the Baroque as it often refused symmetry in favor of asymmetrical designs. Furthermore, it drew inspiration from the artistic forms and ornamentation of Far Eastern Asia, leading to a rise in favour of porcelain figurines and chinoiserie in general. The 18th-century style flourished for a short while; nevertheless, the Rococo style soon fell out of favor, being seen by many as a gaudy and superficial movement emphasizing aesthetics over meaning. Neoclassicism in many ways developed as a counter-movement to the Rococo, the impetus being a sense of disgust directed towards the latter's florid qualities.

=== Mannerism (16th century) ===
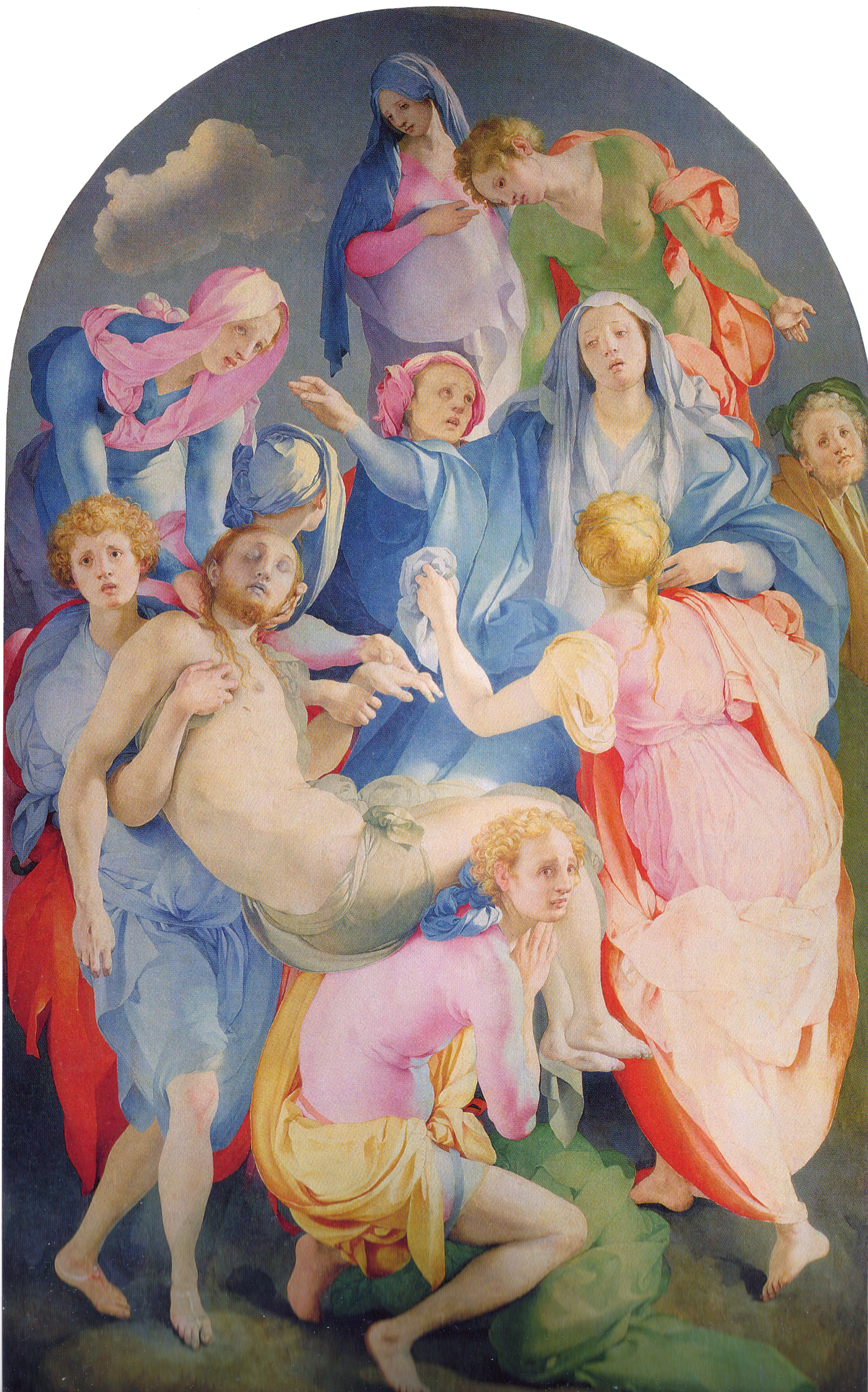
Entombment; by Jacopo da Pontormo; 1525–1528; oil on panel; 3.12 x 1.9 m; Santa Felicita (Florence, Italy)

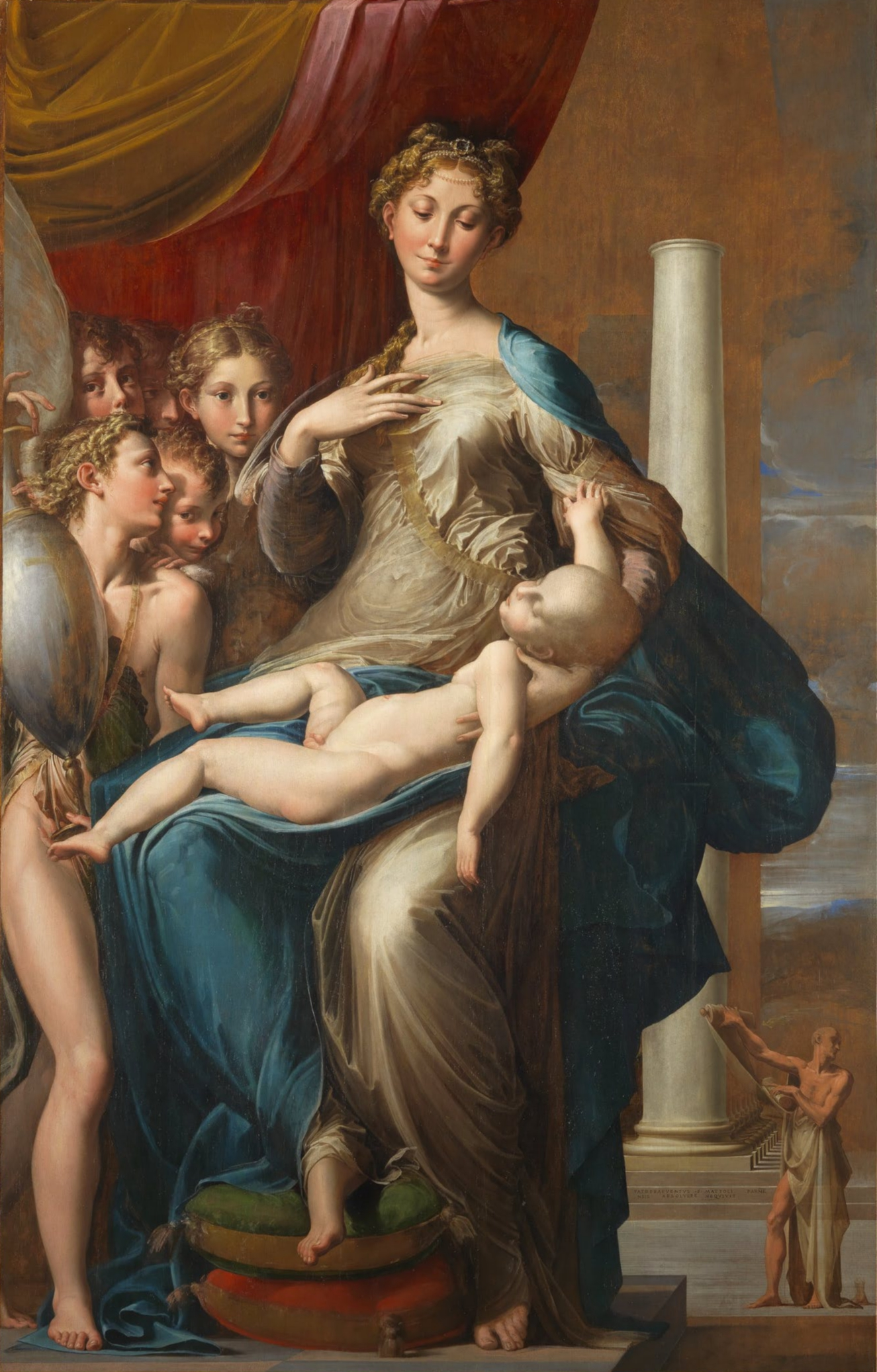
Madonna with the Long Neck; by Parmigianino; 1534–1540; oil on panel; 2.19 x 1.32 m; Uffizi Gallery (Florence)

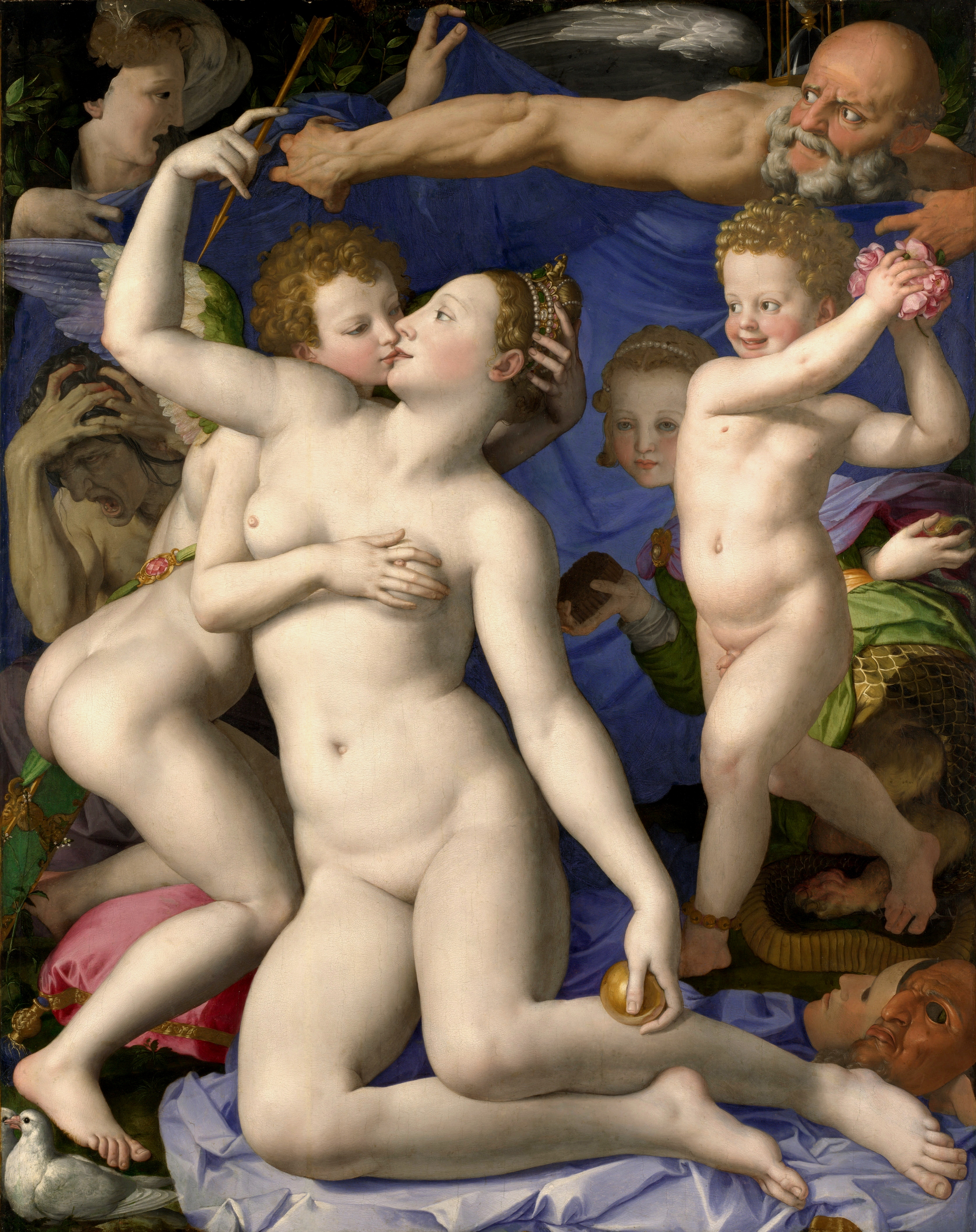
Venus, Cupid, Folly and Time; by Bronzino; mid-1540s; oil on panel; 1.46 x 1.16 m; National Gallery (London)

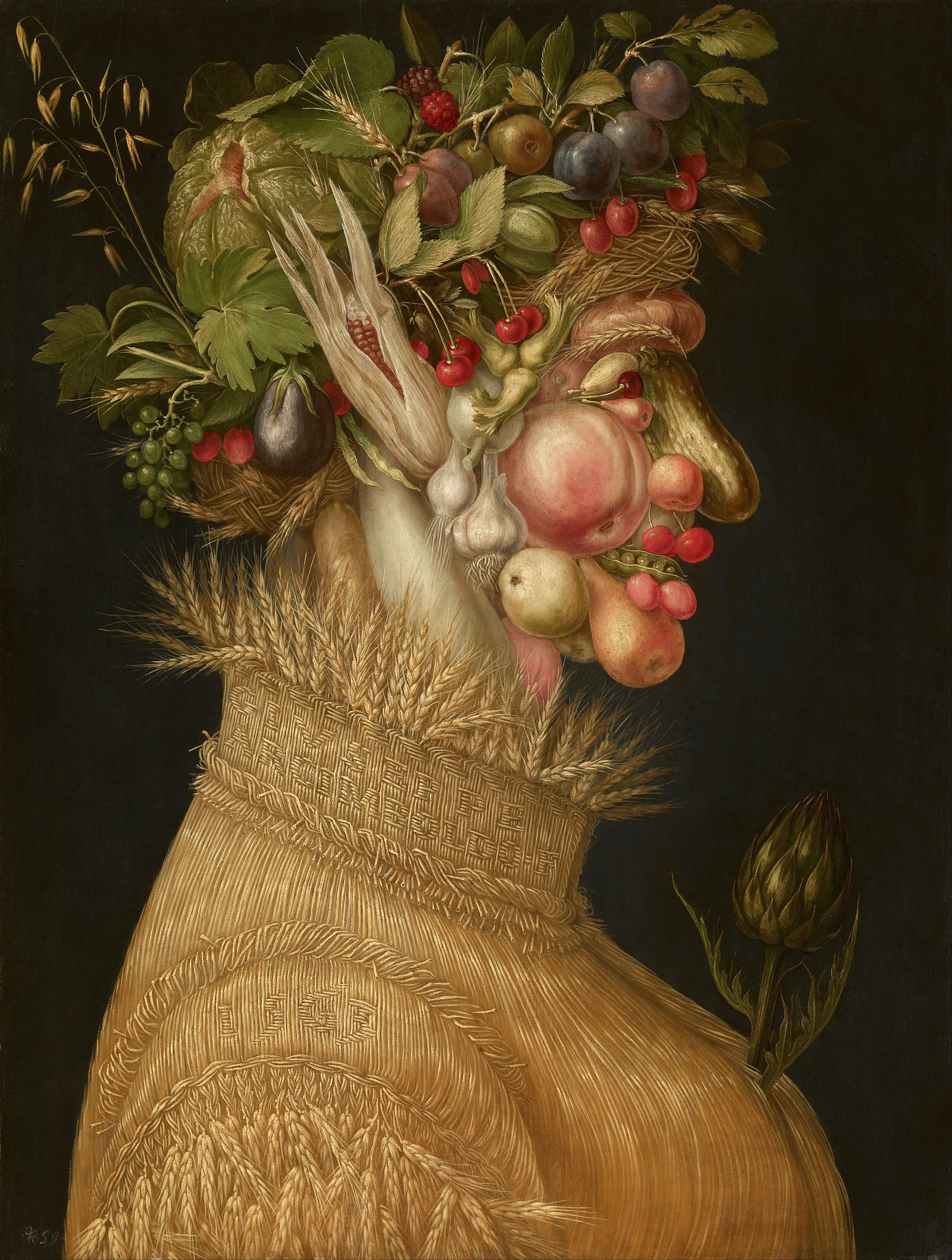
Summer; by Giuseppe Arcimboldo; 1563; oil on panel; 67 x 50.8 cm; Kunsthistorisches Museum (Vienna, Austria)

=== Baroque (early 17th century to mid-early 18th century) ===
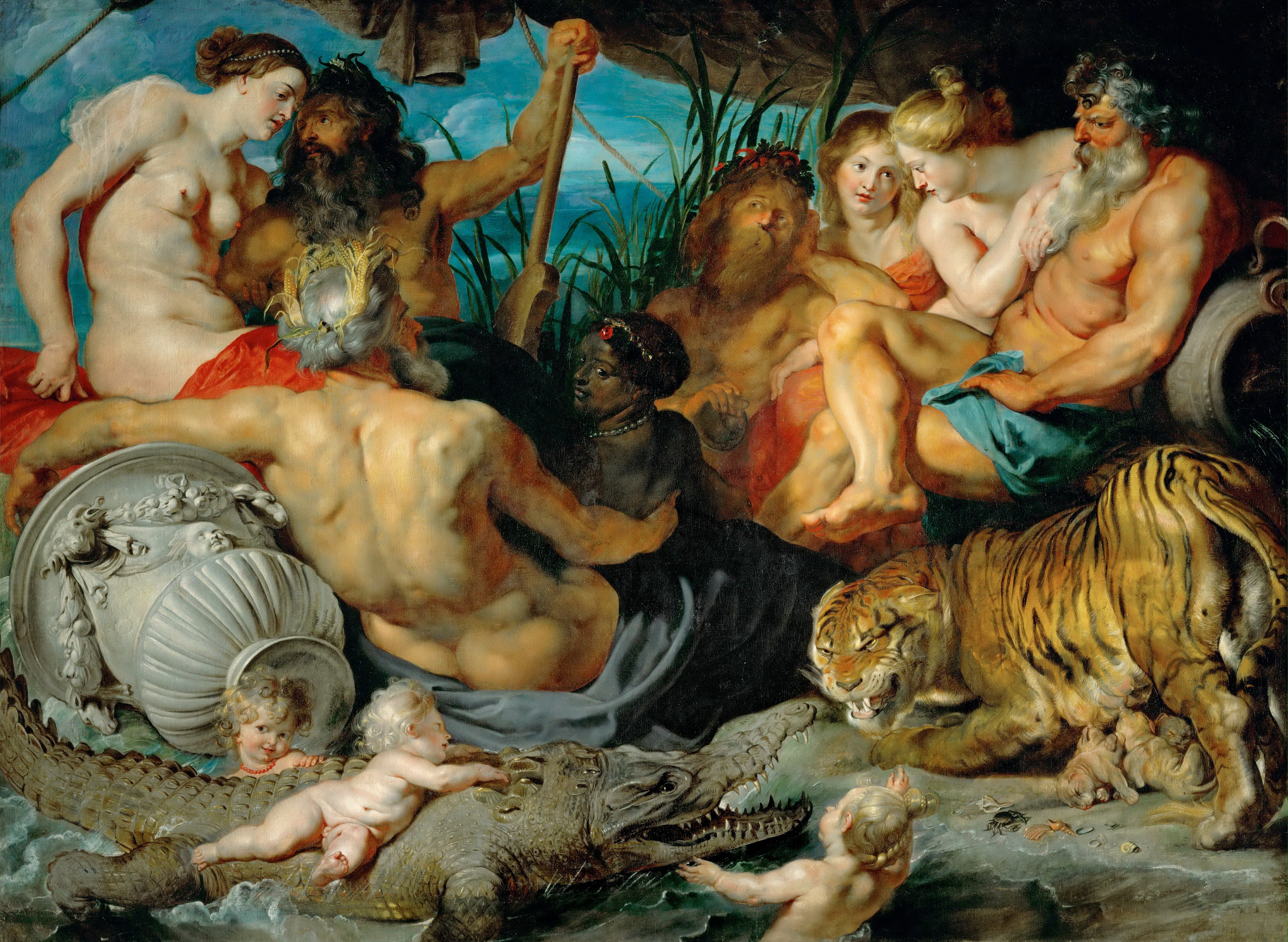
The Four Continents; by Peter Paul Rubens; circa 1615; oil on canvas; 209 x 284 cm; Kunsthistorisches Museum (Vienna, Austria)

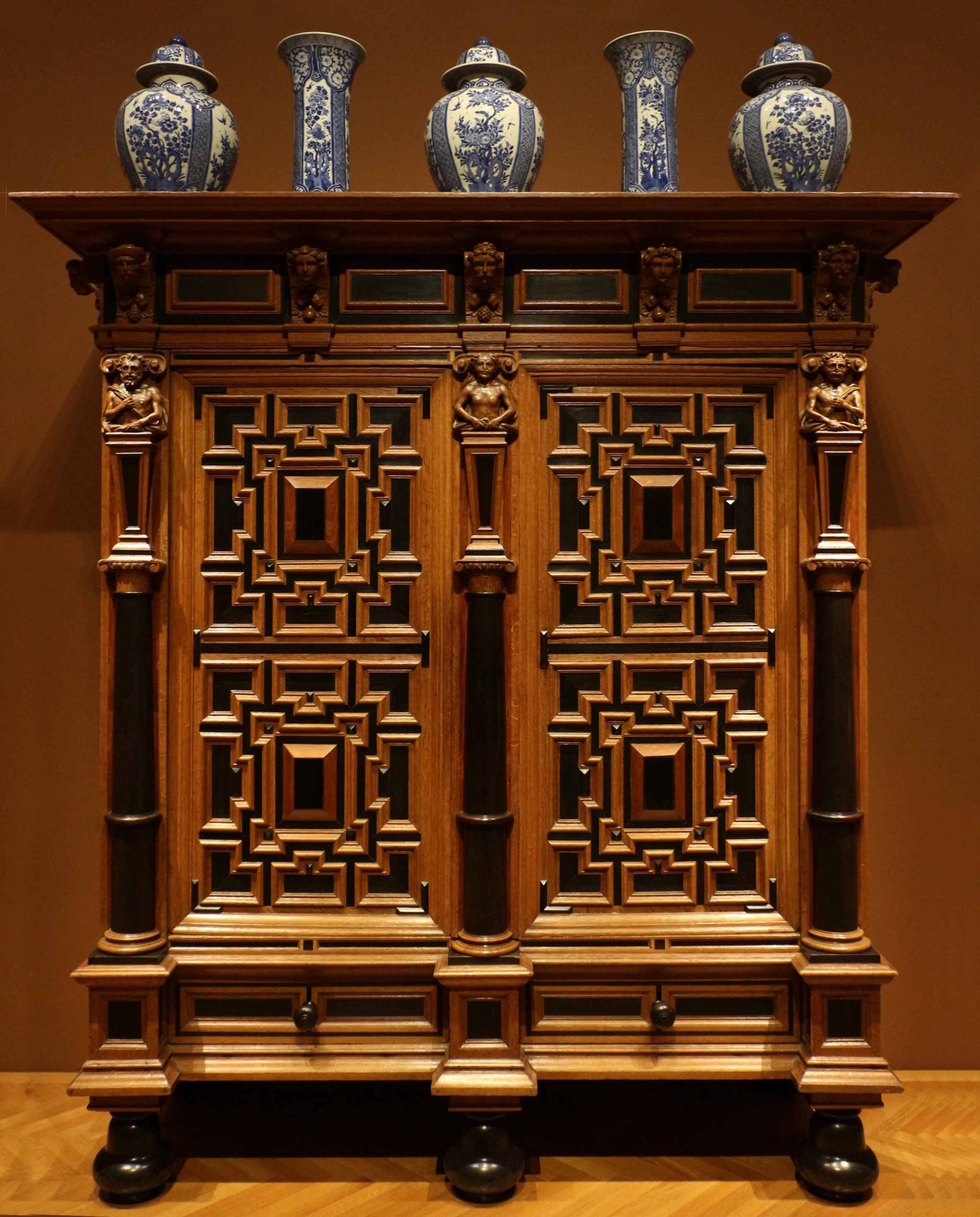
Dutch wardrobe; 1625–1650; oak with ebony and rosewood veneers; overall: 244.5 x 224.3 x 85.2 cm; Cleveland Museum of Art (Cleveland, Ohio, US)

The Night Watch; by Rembrandt; 1642; oil on canvas; 363 × 437 cm; Rijksmuseum (Amsterdam, the Netherlands)

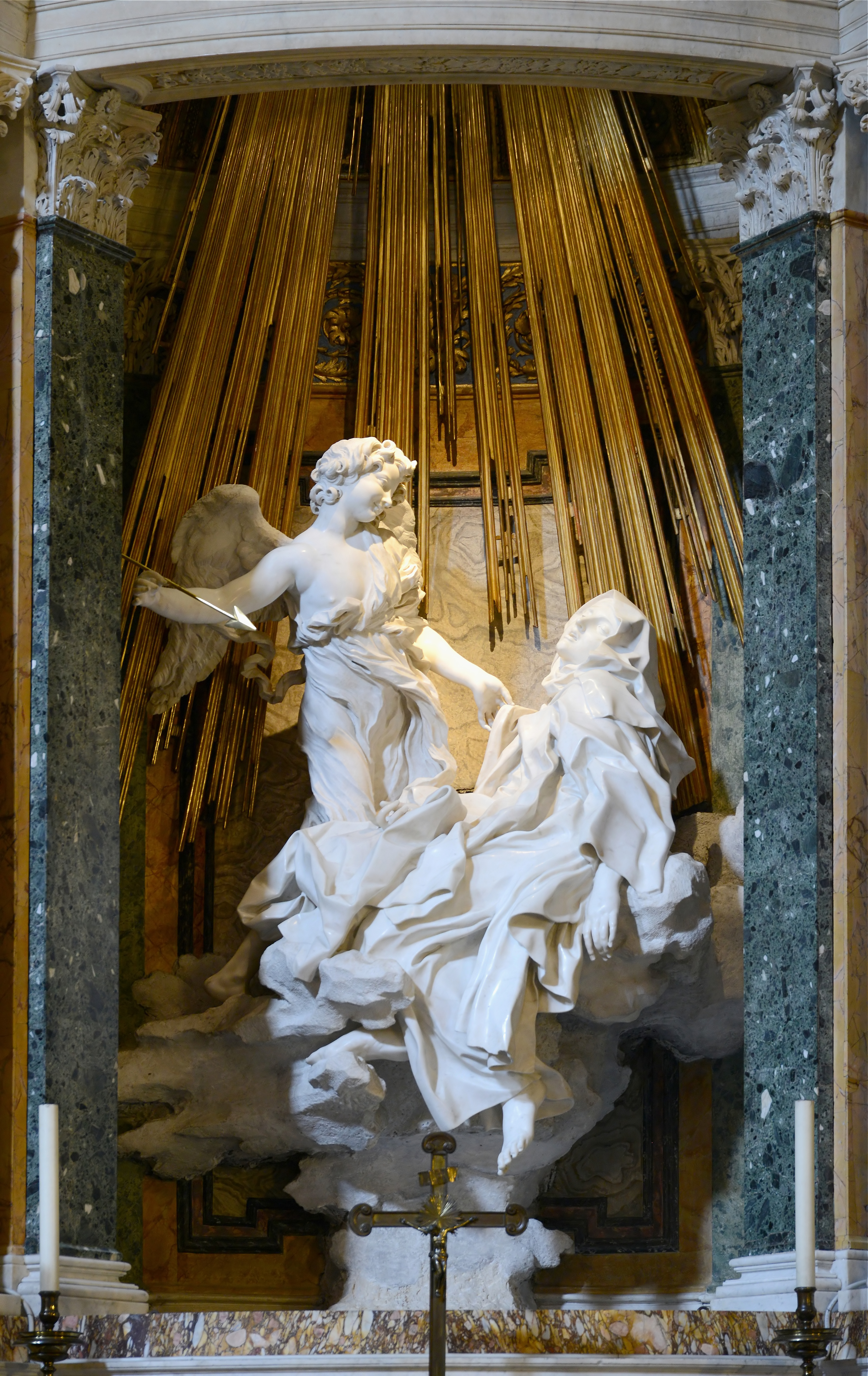
The Ecstasy of Saint Teresa; by Gian Lorenzo Bernini; 1647–1652; marble; height: 3.5 m; Santa Maria della Vittoria (Rome)

Las Meninas; by Diego Velázquez; 1656–1657; oil on canvas; 318 cm × 276 cm; Museo del Prado (Madrid, Spain)

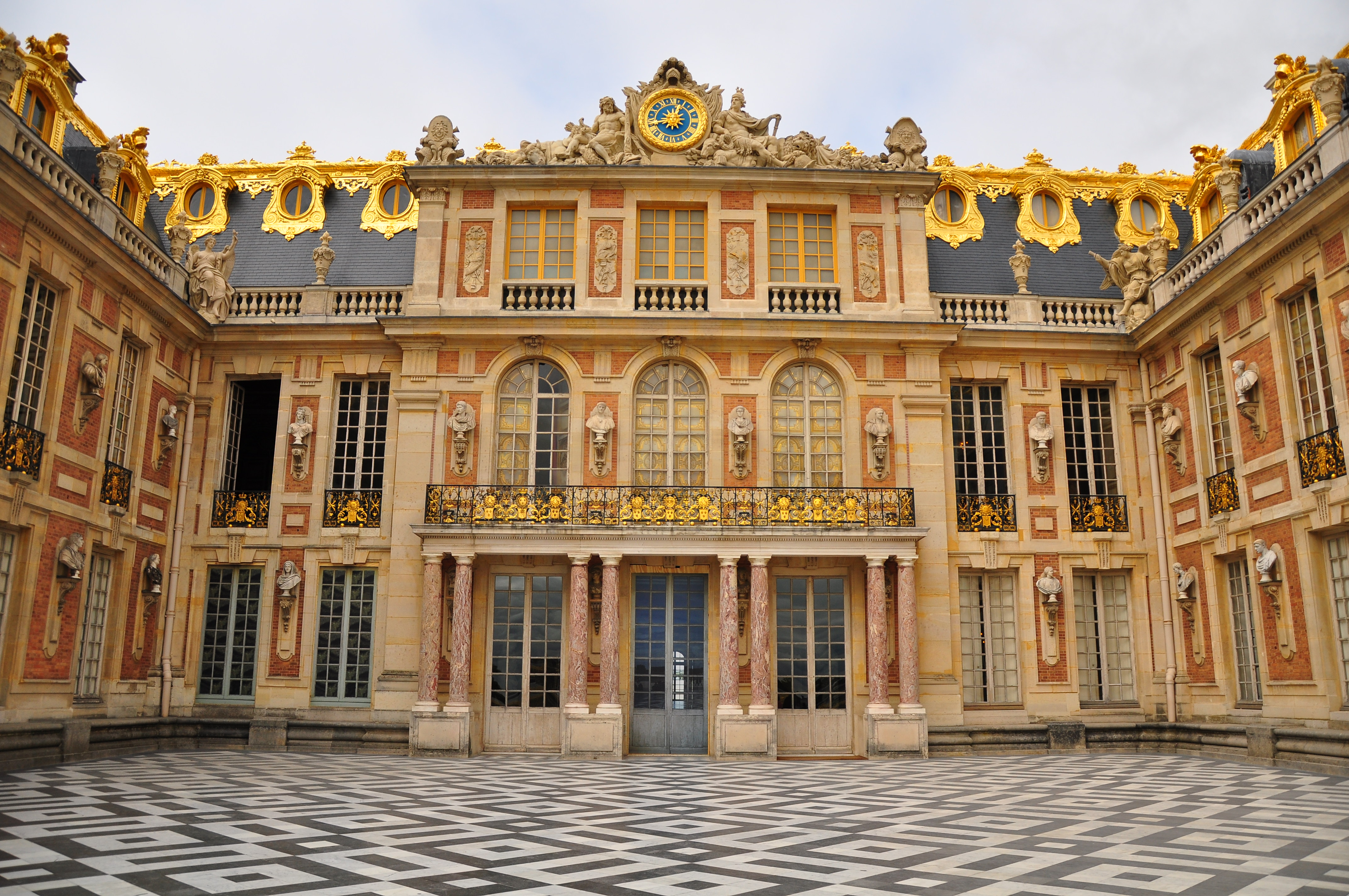
The entrance of the Palace of Versailles (Versailles, France), the most iconic Baroque building

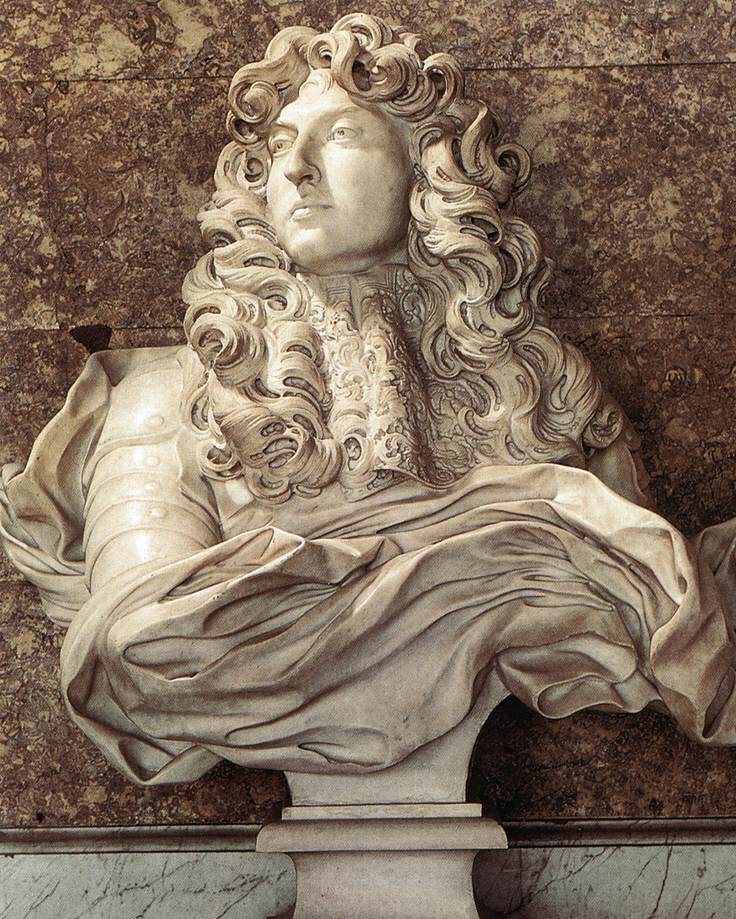
The Bust of Louis XIV; by Gian Lorenzo Bernini; 1665; marble; 105 × 99 × 46 cm; Palace of Versailles

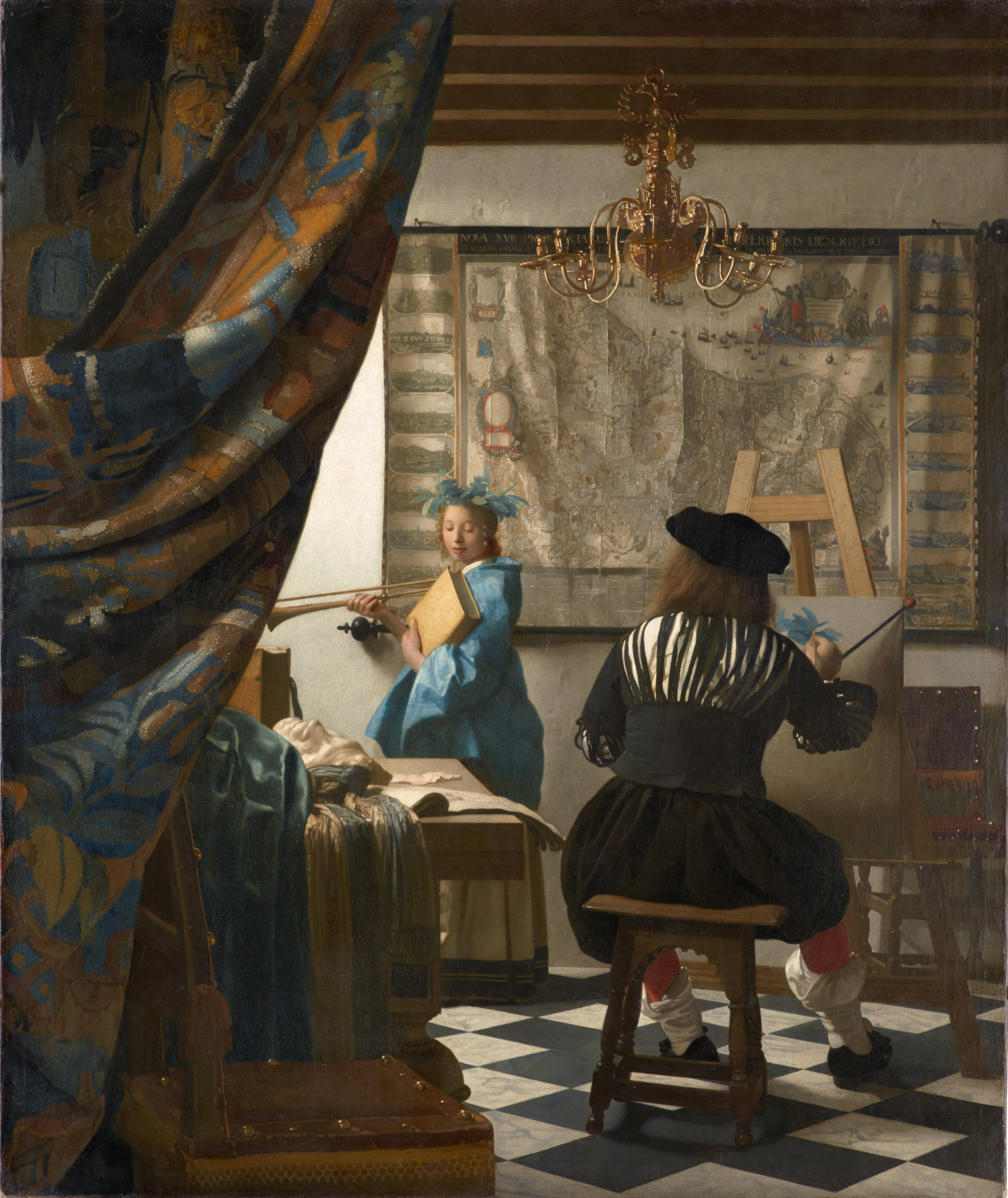
The Art of Painting; by Johannes Vermeer; 1666–1668; oil on canvas; 1.3 x 1.1 m; Kunsthistorisches Museum

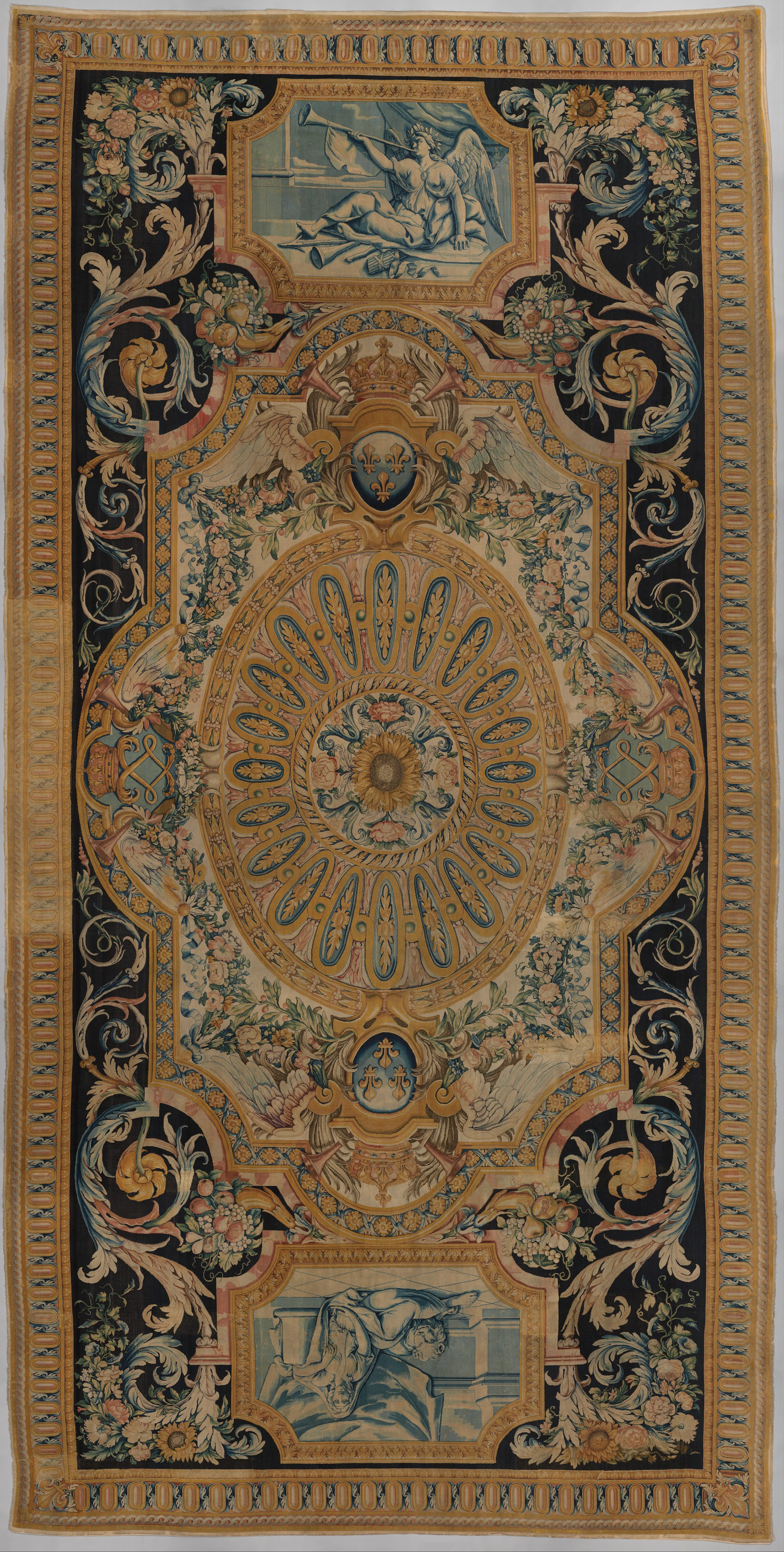
Carpet with fame and fortitude; 1668–1685; knotted and cut wool pile, woven with about 90 knots per square inch; 909.3 x 459.7 cm; Metropolitan Museum of Art

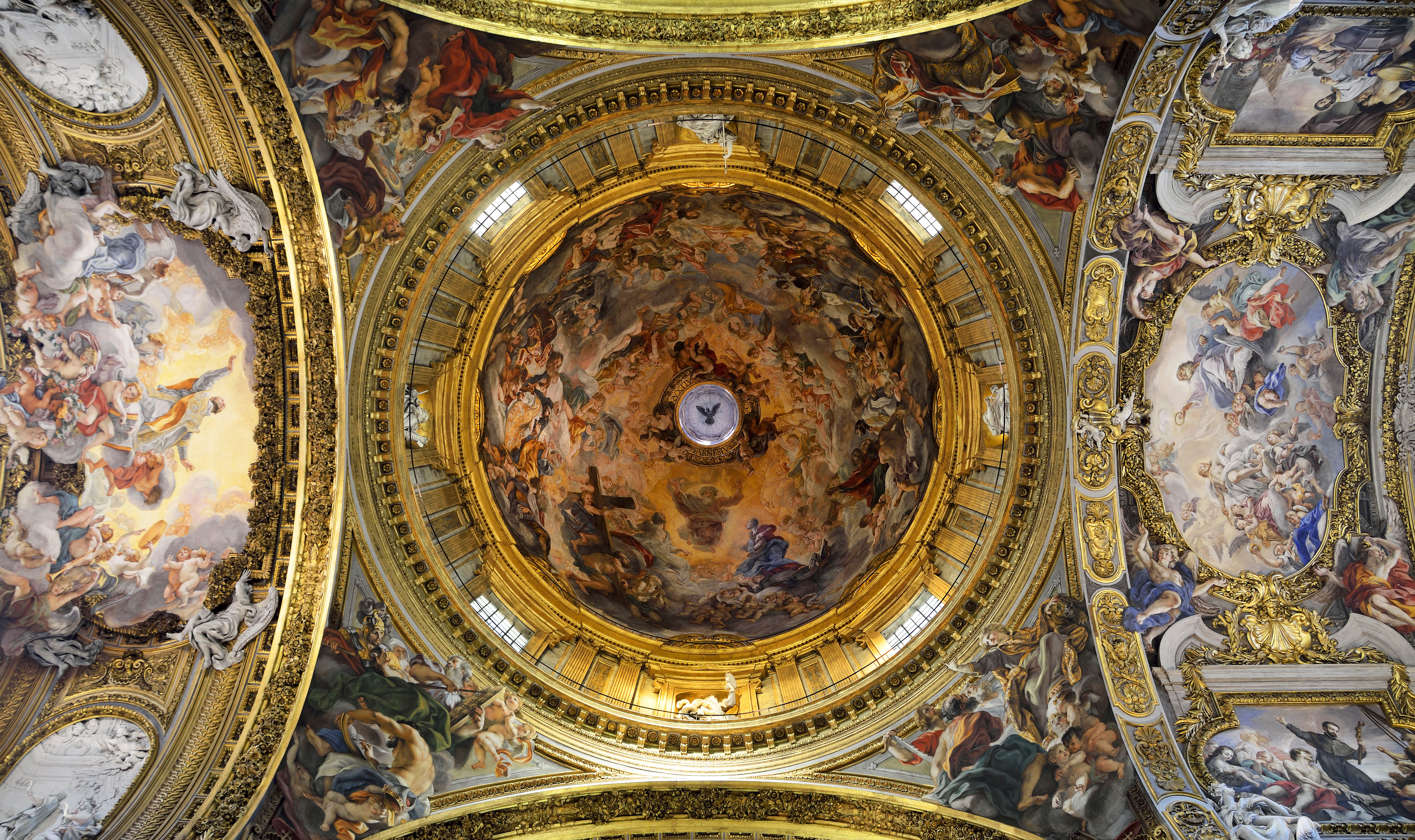
Dome of the Church of the Gesù (Rome), made in 1674 by Giovanni Battista Gaulli

The Portrait of Louis XIV; by Hyacinthe Rigaud; 1701; oil on canvas; 277 × 194 cm; Louvre

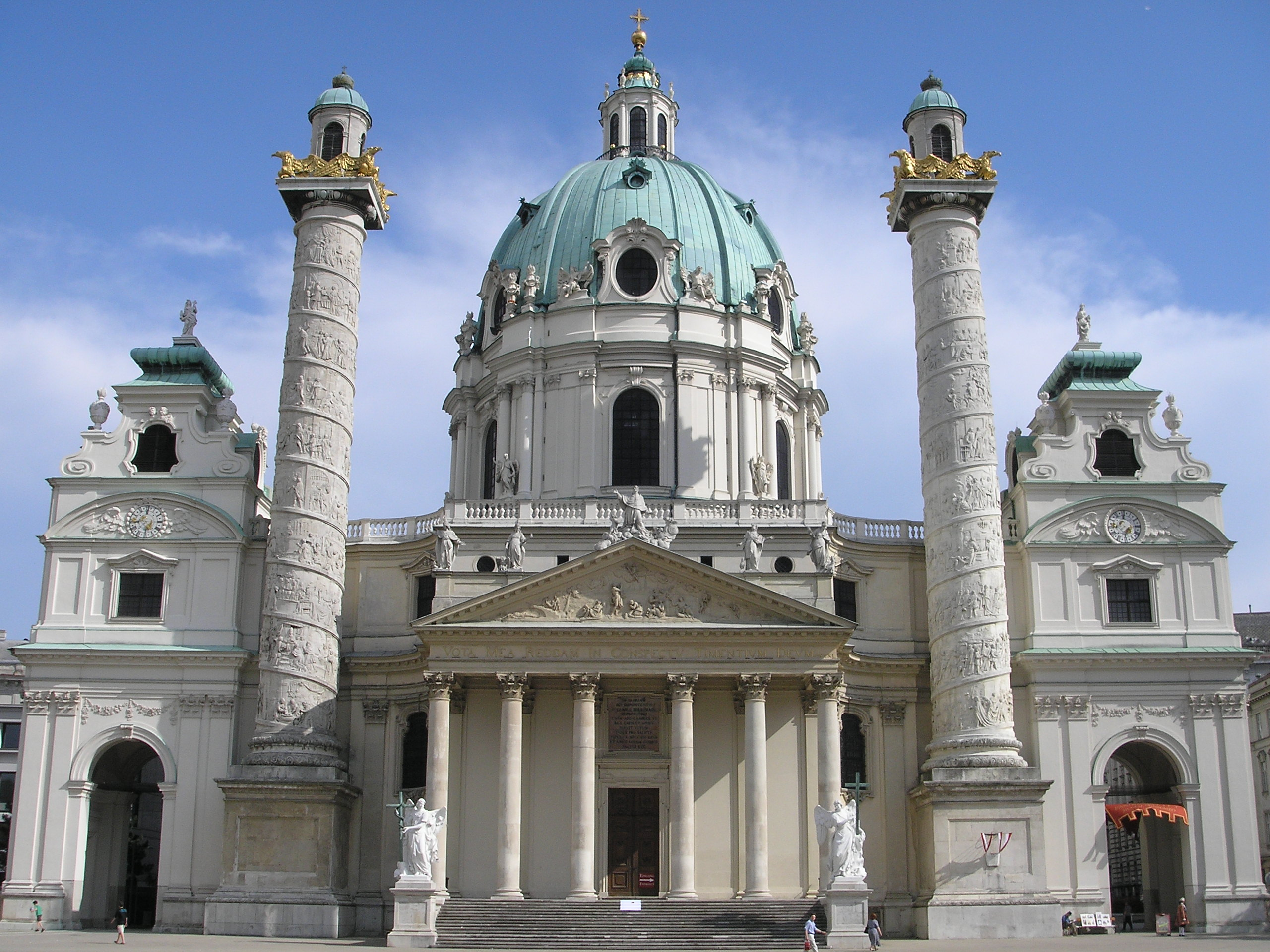
The Karlskirche in Vienna (Austria), built between 1716 and 1737

=== Rococo (early to mid-18th century) ===
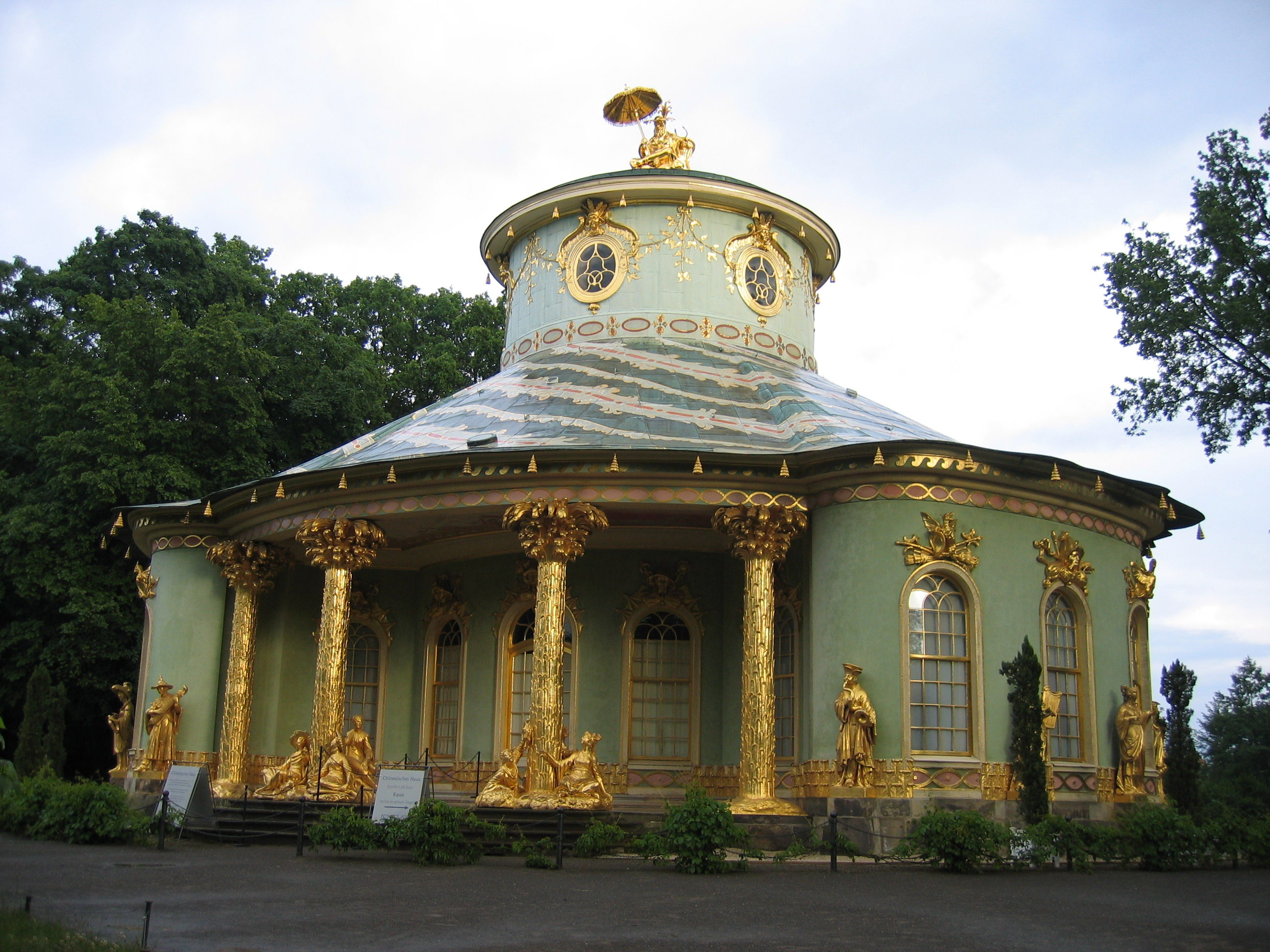
The Chinese House, a chinoiserie garden pavilion in Sanssouci Park, from Potsdam (Germany)

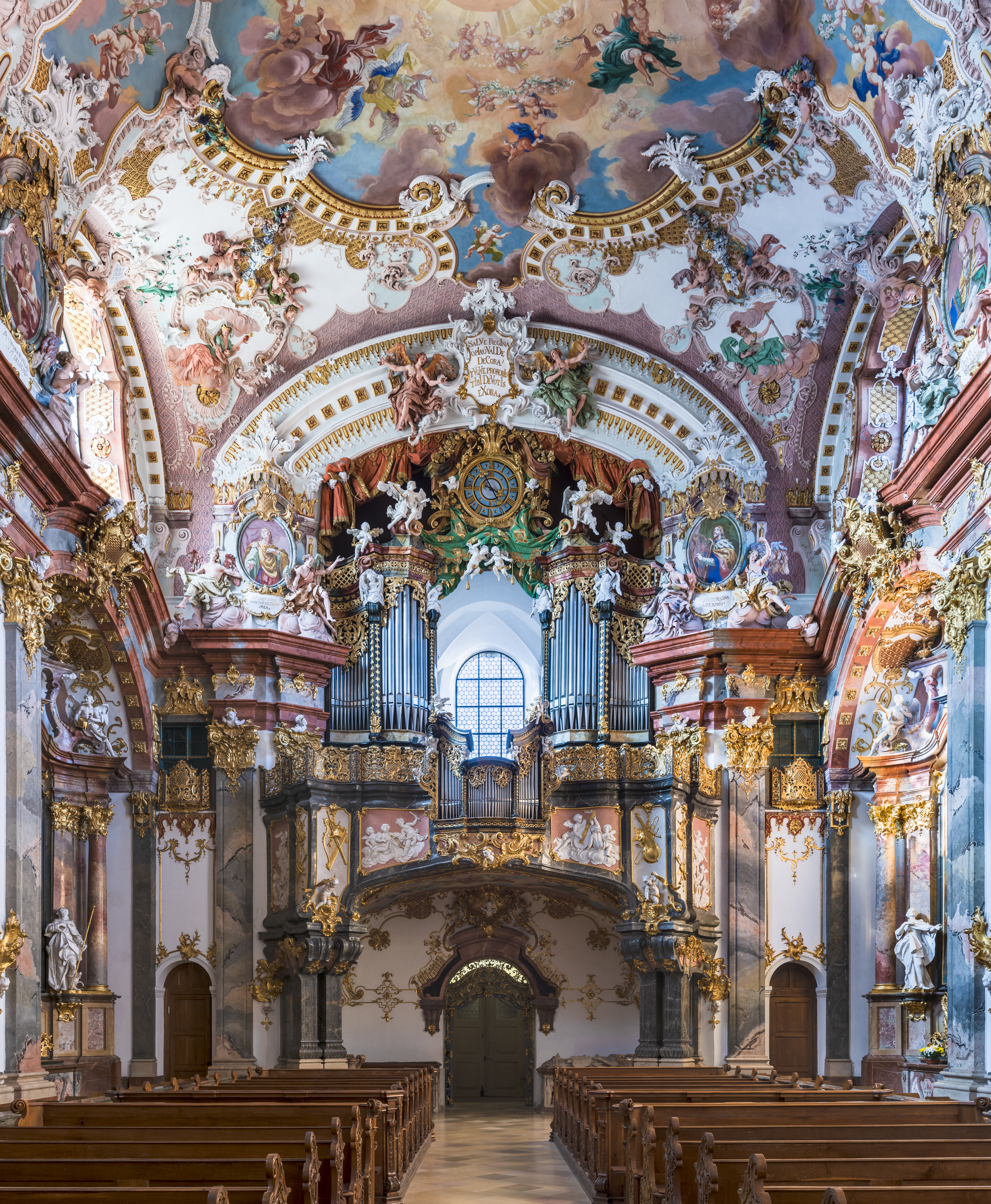
The amazing interior of the Wilhering Abbey (Wilhering, Austria). This interior has a trompe-l'œil on its ceiling, surrounded of highly decorated stuccos

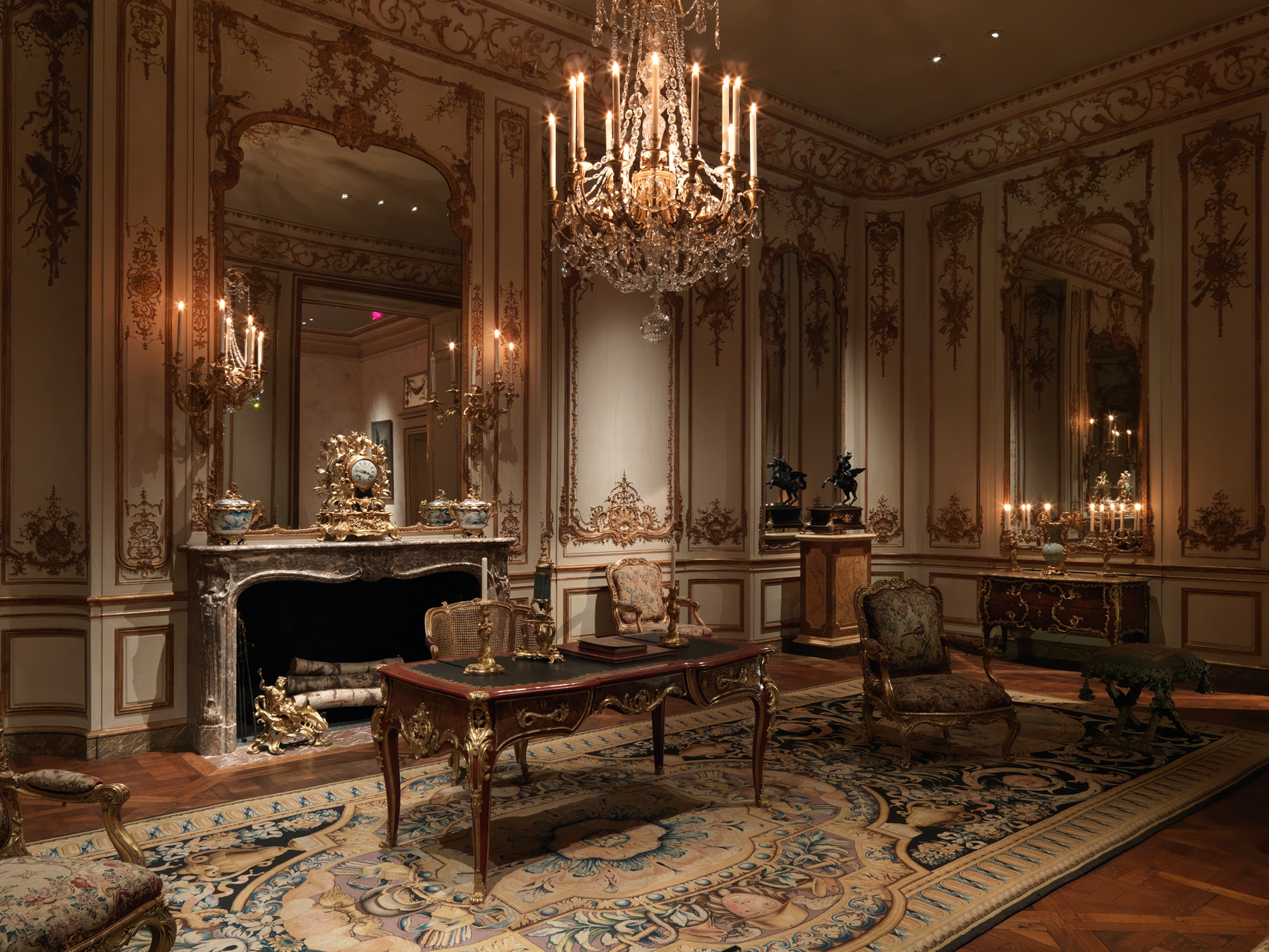
Boiserie from the Hôtel de Varengeville; circa 1736–1752; various materials, including carved, painted, and gilded oak; height: 5.58 m, width: 7.07 m, length: 12.36 m; in the Metropolitan Museum of Art (New York City)

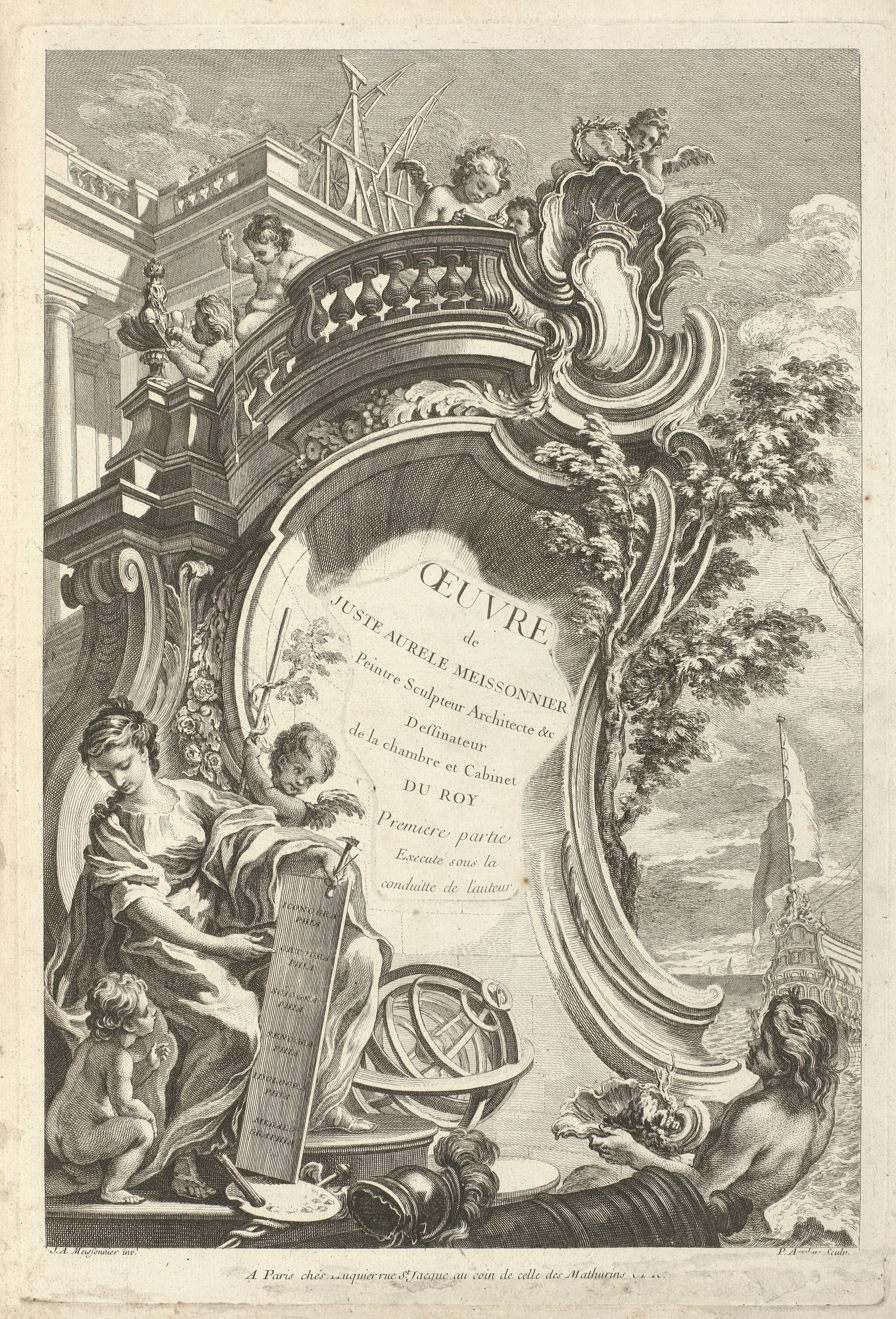
Title print; by Juste Meissonnier; 1738–1749; etching on paper; 51.6 x 34.9 cm; Rijksmuseum

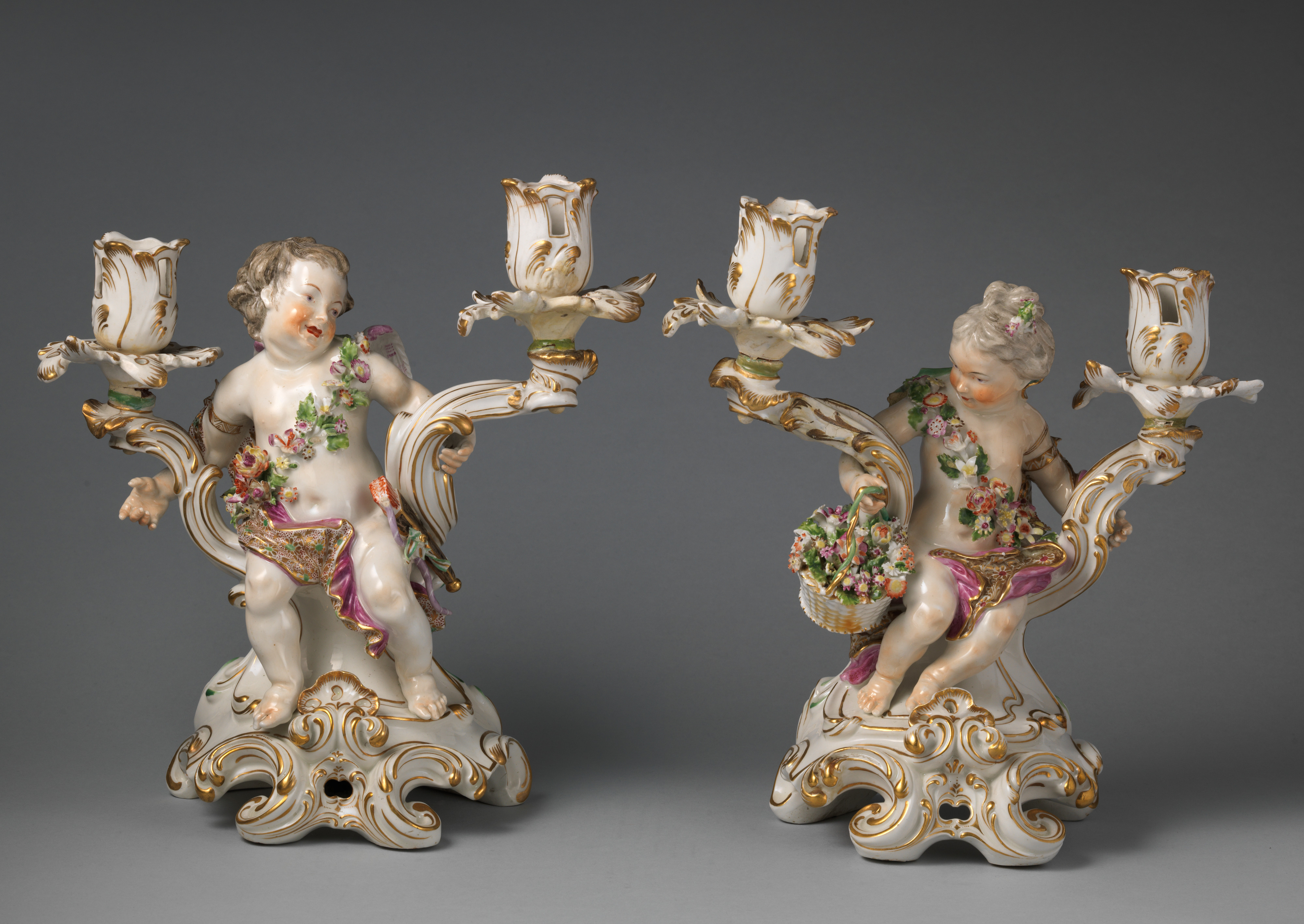
Pair of candelabrums; 18th century; soft-paste porcelain; heights (the left one): 26.8 cm, (the right one): 26.4 cm; by the Chelsea porcelain factory; Metropolitan Museum of Art

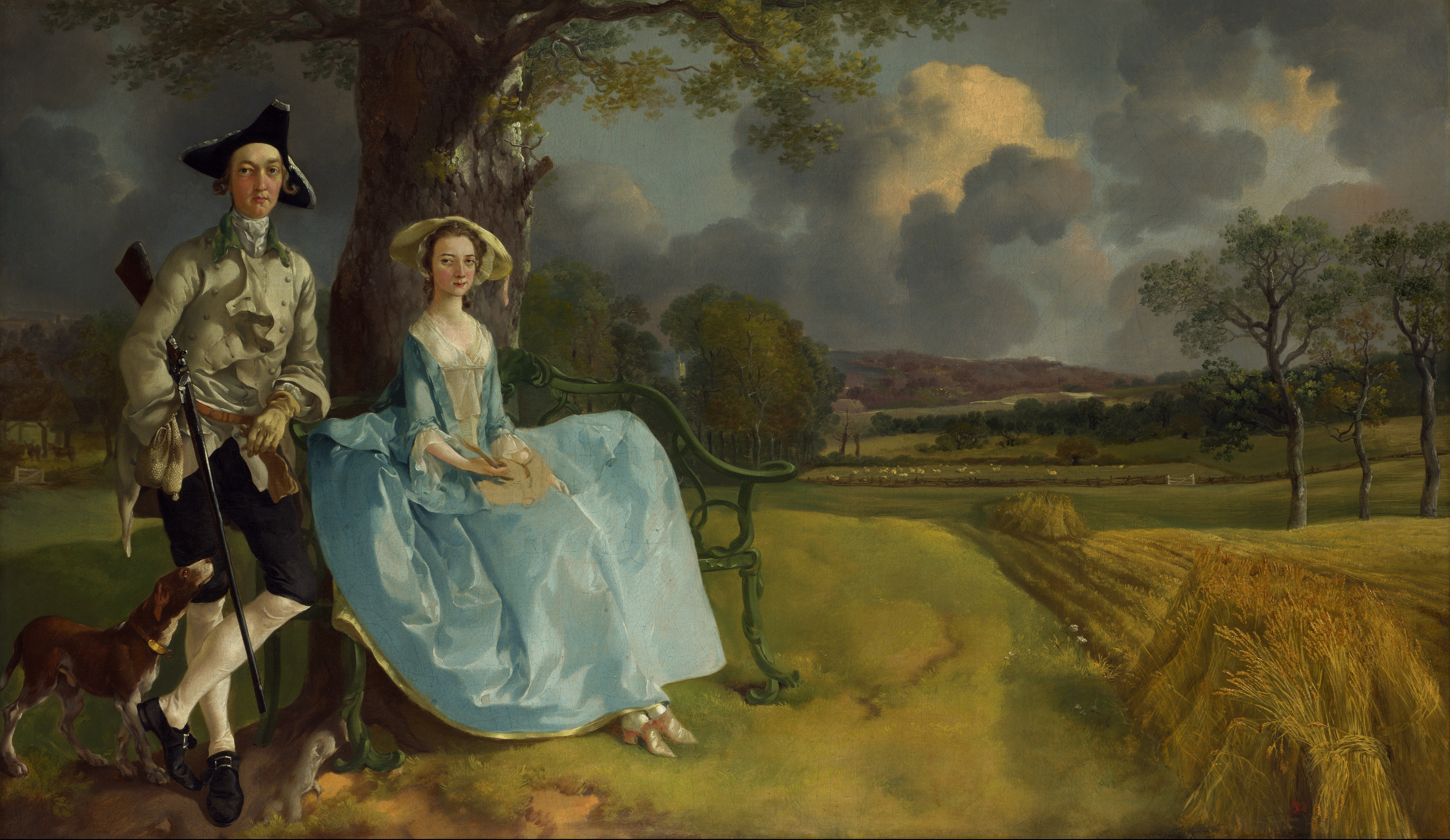
Mr and Mrs Andrews; by Thomas Gainsborough; circa 1750; oil on canvas; 69.8 x 119.4 cm; National Gallery (London)

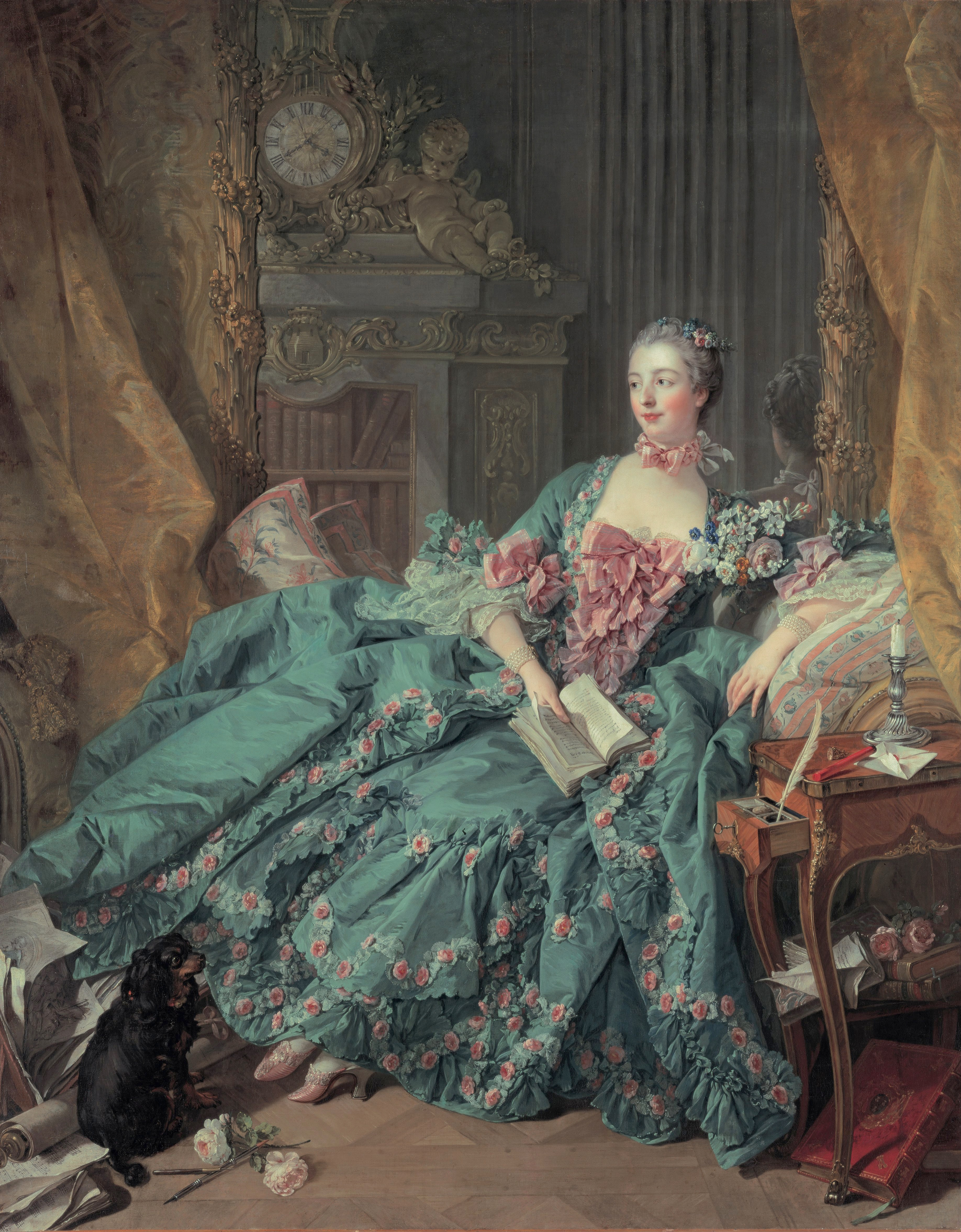
Madame de Pompadour; by François Boucher; 1756; oil on canvas; 2.01 x 1.57 m; Alte Pinakothek (Munich, Germany)

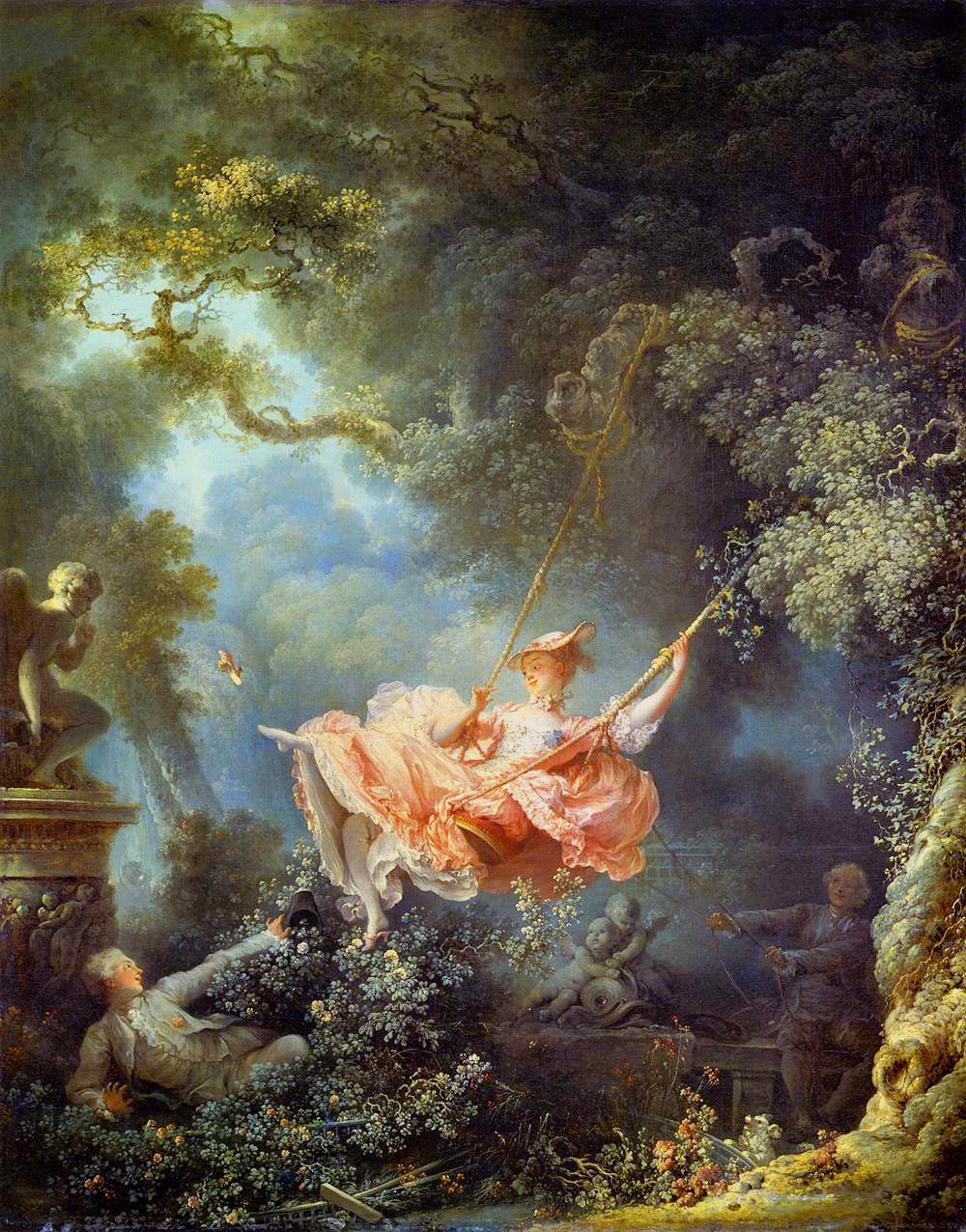
The Swing; by Jean-Honoré Fragonard; 1767–1768; oil on canvas; height: 81 cm, width: 64 cm; Wallace Collection (London)

== Neoclassicism, Romanticism, Academism, and Realism ==
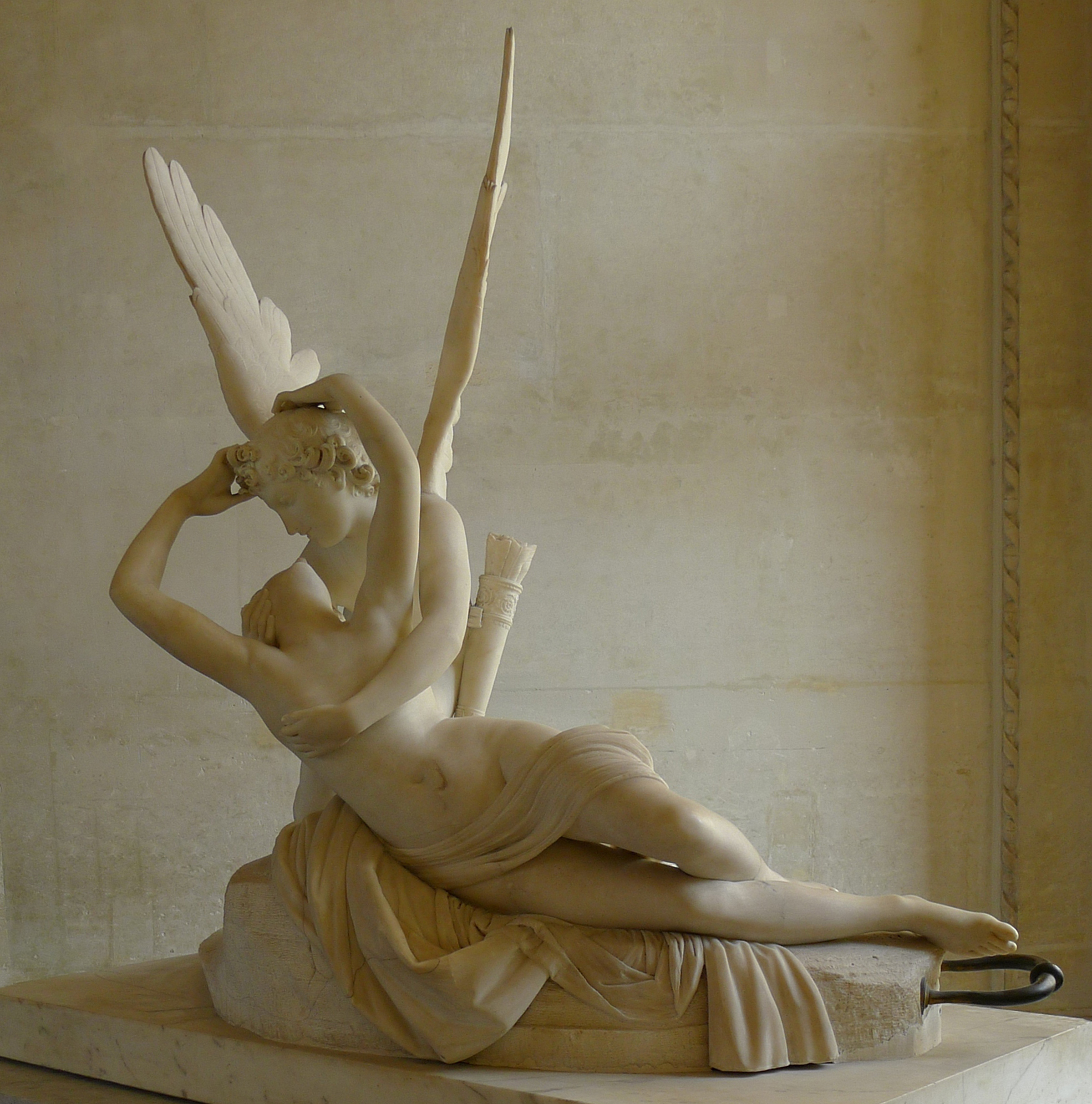
Neoclassical art, inspired by different classical themes, was characterised by an emphasis on simplicity, order and idealism. In the image Antonio Canova's Psyche Revived by Cupid's Kiss (1787-1793)

Throughout the 18th century, a counter movement opposing the Rococo sprang up in different parts of Europe, commonly known as Neoclassicism. It despised the perceived superficiality and frivolity of Rococo art, and desired a return to the simplicity, order, and 'purism' of classical antiquity, especially ancient Greece and Rome. The movement was also, in part, influenced by the Renaissance, which itself was strongly influenced by classical art. Neoclassicism was the artistic component of the intellectual movement known as the Enlightenment; the Enlightenment was idealistic and put its emphasis on objectivity, reason, and empirical truth. Neoclassicism had become widespread in Europe throughout the 18th century, especially in the United Kingdom, which saw great works of Neoclassical architecture spring up during this period; Neoclassicism's fascination with classical antiquity can be seen in the popularity of the Grand Tour during this decade, where wealthy aristocrats travelled to the ancient ruins of Italy and Greece. Nevertheless, a defining moment for Neoclassicism came during the French Revolution in the late 18th century; in France, Rococo art was replaced with the preferred Neoclassical art, which was seen as more serious than the former movement. In many ways, Neoclassicism can be seen as both a political and an artistic and cultural movement. Neoclassical art emphasizes order, symmetry, and classical simplicity; common themes in Neoclassical art include courage and war, as were commonly explored in ancient Greek and Roman art. Ingres, Canova, and Jacques-Louis David are among the best-known neoclassicists.

Eugène Delacroix, Liberty Leading the People 1830, Romantic art.

Just as Mannerism rejected Classicism, so did Romanticism reject the ideas of the Enlightenment and the aesthetic of the Neoclassicists. Romanticism rejected the highly objective and ordered nature of Neoclassicism and opted for a more individual and emotional approach to the arts. Romanticism emphasized nature, especially when aiming to portray the power and beauty of the natural world, and emotions, and sought a highly personal approach to art. Romantic art was about individual feelings, not common themes, unlike Neoclassicism; in this way, Romantic art often used colour to express feelings and emotion. Similarly to Neoclassicism, Romantic art took much of its inspiration from ancient Greek and Roman art and mythology, yet, unlike Neoclassicism, this inspiration was primarily used as a way to create symbolism and imagery. Romantic art also takes much of its aesthetic qualities from medievalism and Gothicism, as well as mythology and folklore. Among the greatest Romantic artists were Eugène Delacroix, Francisco Goya, J. M. W. Turner, John Constable, Caspar David Friedrich, Thomas Cole, and William Blake.

Most artists adopted a centrist approach, incorporating elements of Neoclassical and Romantic styles to synthesize them. The different attempts took place within the French Academy and are collectively called Academic art. Adolphe William Bouguereau is considered a chief example of this stream of art.

In the early 19th century, the face of Europe was, however, radically altered by industrialization. Poverty, squalor, and desperation were to be the fate of the new working class created by the "revolution". In response to these changes going on in society, the movement of Realism emerged. Realism sought to accurately portray the conditions and hardships of the poor in the hopes of changing society. In contrast with Romanticism, which was essentially optimistic about humanity, Realism offered a stark vision of poverty and despair. Similarly, while Romanticism glorified nature, Realism portrayed life in the depths of an urban wasteland. Like Romanticism, Realism was a literary as well as an artistic movement. The great Realist painters include Jean-Baptiste-Siméon Chardin, Gustave Courbet, Jean-François Millet, Camille Corot, Honoré Daumier, Édouard Manet, Edgar Degas (both considered as Impressionists), and Thomas Eakins, among others.

The response of architecture to industrialisation, in stark contrast to the other arts, was to veer towards historicism. Although the railway stations built during this period are often considered the truest reflections of its spirit – they are sometimes called "the cathedrals of the age" – the main movements in architecture during the Industrial Age were revivals of styles from the distant past, such as the Gothic Revival. Related movements included the Pre-Raphaelite Brotherhood, who sought to return art to its "purity" before Raphael, and the Arts and Crafts Movement, which reacted against the impersonality of mass-produced goods and advocated a return to medieval craftsmanship.

Time Period:

- Neoclassicism: mid-early 18th century to early 19th century
- Romanticism: late 18th century to mid-19th century
- Realism: 19th century

== Modern art ==
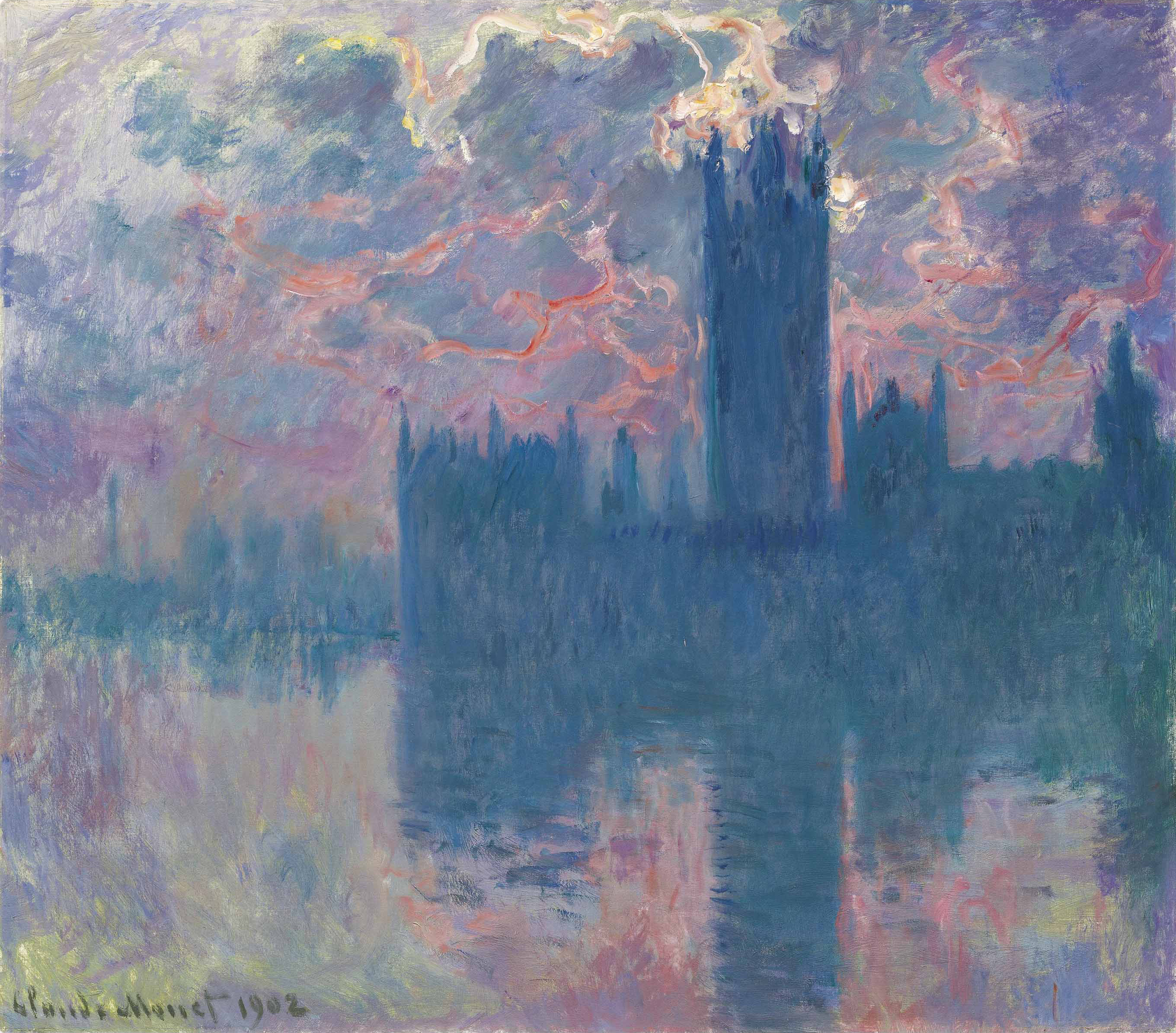
Impressionism was known for its usage of light and movement in its paintings, as in Claude Monet's 1902 Houses of Parliament, sunset

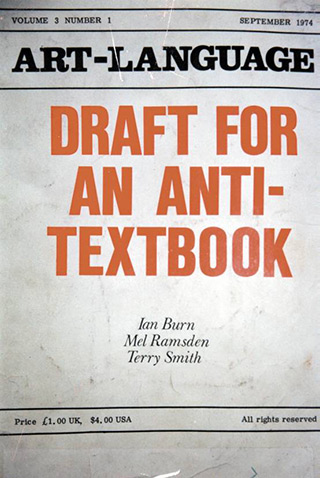
Art & Language are known for their major input on conceptual art.

Out of the naturalist ethic of Realism grew a major artistic movement, Impressionism. The Impressionists pioneered the use of light in painting, attempting to capture it as seen by the human eye. Edgar Degas, Édouard Manet, Claude Monet, Camille Pissarro, and Pierre-Auguste Renoir, were all involved in the Impressionist movement. As a direct outgrowth of Impressionism, Post-Impressionism developed. Paul Cézanne, Vincent van Gogh, Paul Gauguin, Georges Seurat are the best known Post-Impressionists.

Following the Impressionists and the Post-Impressionists came Fauvism, often considered the first "modern" genre of art. Just as the Impressionists revolutionized light, so did the Fauvists rethink color, painting their canvases in bright, wild hues. After the Fauvists, modern art began to develop in all its forms, ranging from Expressionism, concerned with evoking emotion through objective works of art, to Cubism, the art of transposing a four-dimensional reality onto a flat canvas, to Abstract art. These new art forms pushed the limits of traditional notions of "art" and corresponded to the rapid changes taking place in human society, technology, and thought.

Surrealism is often classified as a form of Modern Art. However, the Surrealists themselves have objected to the study of surrealism as an era in art history, claiming that it oversimplifies the complexity of the movement (which they say is not an artistic movement), misrepresents the relationship of surrealism to aesthetics, and falsely characterizes ongoing surrealism as a finished, historically encapsulated era. Other forms of Modern art (some of which border on Contemporary art) include:

- Abstract expressionism
- Art Deco
- Art Nouveau
- Bauhaus
- Color Field painting
- Conceptual Art
- Constructivism
- Cubism
- Dada
- Der Blaue Reiter
- De Stijl
- Die Brücke
- Body art
- Expressionism
- Fauvism
- Fluxus
- Futurism
- Happening
- Surrealism
- Lettrisme
- Lyrical Abstraction
- Land art
- Minimalism
- Naive art
- Op art
- Performance art
- Photorealism
- Pop art
- Suprematism
- Video art
- Vorticism

Time Period:

- Impressionism: late 19th century
- Others: First half of the 20th century

== Contemporary art and Postmodern art ==
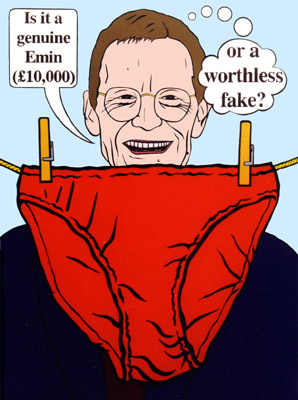
Charles Thomson. Sir Nicholas Serota Makes an Acquisitions Decision, 2000, Stuckism.

Modern art foreshadowed several characteristics of what would later be defined as postmodern art; in fact, several modern art movements can often be classified as both modern and postmodern, such as pop art. Postmodern art, for instance, places a strong emphasis on irony, parody, and humour; modern art began to develop a more ironic approach, which would later advance in a postmodern context. Postmodern art blurs the boundaries between the high and fine arts and low-end and commercial art; modern art began experimenting with this blurring. Recent developments in art have been characterised by a significant expansion of what can now be deemed art, in terms of materials, media, activities, and concepts. Conceptual art in particular has had a wide influence. This started literally as the replacement of a concept for a made object, one of the intentions of which was to refute the commodification of art. However, it now usually refers to an artwork where there is an object, but the main claim for the work is made for the thought process that has informed it. The aspect of commercialism has returned to the work.

There has also been an increase in art that refers to previous movements and artists and gains validity from that reference.

Postmodernism in art, which has grown since the 1960s, differs from Modernism in that Modern art movements were primarily focused on their own activities and values. In contrast, Postmodernism draws on the whole range of previous movements as a reference point. This has, by definition, generated a relativistic outlook, accompanied by irony and a certain disbelief in values, as each can be seen to be replaced by another. Another result of this has been the growth of commercialism and celebrity. Postmodern art has questioned common rules and guidelines of what is regarded as 'fine art', merging low art with the fine arts until neither is fully distinguishable. Before the advent of postmodernism, the fine arts were characterised by a form of aesthetic quality, elegance, craftsmanship, finesse and intellectual stimulation which was intended to appeal to the upper or educated classes; this distinguished high art from low art, which, in turn, was seen as tacky, kitsch, easily made and lacking in much or any intellectual stimulation, art which was intended to appeal to the masses. Postmodern art blurred these distinctions, bringing a strong element of kitsch, commercialism, and campness into contemporary fine art; what is nowadays seen as fine art may have been seen as low art before postmodernism revolutionised the concept of what high or fine art truly is. In addition, the postmodern nature of contemporary art leaves a lot of space for individualism within the art scene; for instance, postmodern art often takes inspiration from past artistic movements, such as Gothic or Baroque art, and both juxtaposes and recycles styles from these past periods in a different context.

Some surrealists in particular Joan Miró, who called for the "murder of painting" (In numerous interviews dating from the 1930s onwards, Miró expressed contempt for conventional painting methods and his desire to "kill", "murder", or "rape" them in favor of more contemporary means of expression) have denounced or attempted to "supersede" painting, and there have also been other anti-painting trends among artistic movements, such as that of Dada and conceptual art. The trend away from painting in the late 20th century has been countered by various movements, for example the continuation of Minimal Art, Lyrical Abstraction, Pop Art, Op Art, New Realism, Photorealism, Neo Geo, Neo-expressionism, New European Painting, Stuckism, Excessivism and various other important and influential painterly directions.

== See also ==
- History of art
- History of painting
- Lives of the Most Excellent Painters, Sculptors, and Architects (16th century book)
- Modernism
- Painting in the Americas before European colonization
- List of time periods

== Bibliography ==
- Chapin, Anne P., "Power, Privilege and Landscape in Minoan Art", in Charis: Essays in Honor of Sara A. Immerwahr, Hesperia (Princeton, N.J.) 33, 2004, ASCSA, ISBN 0876615337, 9780876615331, google books
- Gates, Charles, "Pictorial Imagery in Minoan Wall Painting", in Charis: Essays in Honor of Sara A. Immerwahr, Hesperia (Princeton, N.J.) 33, 2004, ASCSA, ISBN 0876615337, 9780876615331, google books
- Hood, Sinclair, The Arts in Prehistoric Greece, 1978, Penguin (Penguin/Yale History of Art), ISBN 0140561420
- Sandars, Nancy K., Prehistoric Art in Europe, Penguin (Pelican, now Yale, History of Art), 1968 (nb 1st edn.; early datings now superseded)
